

74001–74100 

|-bgcolor=#fefefe
| 74001 ||  || — || March 20, 1998 || Socorro || LINEAR || FLO || align=right | 2.2 km || 
|-id=002 bgcolor=#fefefe
| 74002 ||  || — || March 20, 1998 || Socorro || LINEAR || NYS || align=right | 1.7 km || 
|-id=003 bgcolor=#fefefe
| 74003 ||  || — || March 20, 1998 || Socorro || LINEAR || ERI || align=right | 3.6 km || 
|-id=004 bgcolor=#fefefe
| 74004 ||  || — || March 20, 1998 || Socorro || LINEAR || — || align=right | 1.5 km || 
|-id=005 bgcolor=#fefefe
| 74005 ||  || — || March 20, 1998 || Socorro || LINEAR || NYS || align=right | 1.6 km || 
|-id=006 bgcolor=#d6d6d6
| 74006 ||  || — || March 20, 1998 || Socorro || LINEAR || — || align=right | 6.9 km || 
|-id=007 bgcolor=#fefefe
| 74007 ||  || — || March 24, 1998 || Socorro || LINEAR || — || align=right | 1.8 km || 
|-id=008 bgcolor=#fefefe
| 74008 ||  || — || March 31, 1998 || Socorro || LINEAR || FLO || align=right | 1.6 km || 
|-id=009 bgcolor=#fefefe
| 74009 ||  || — || March 31, 1998 || Socorro || LINEAR || V || align=right | 1.7 km || 
|-id=010 bgcolor=#fefefe
| 74010 ||  || — || March 31, 1998 || Socorro || LINEAR || V || align=right | 2.0 km || 
|-id=011 bgcolor=#fefefe
| 74011 ||  || — || March 31, 1998 || Socorro || LINEAR || V || align=right | 1.2 km || 
|-id=012 bgcolor=#fefefe
| 74012 ||  || — || March 31, 1998 || Socorro || LINEAR || — || align=right | 3.6 km || 
|-id=013 bgcolor=#fefefe
| 74013 ||  || — || March 31, 1998 || Socorro || LINEAR || V || align=right | 1.5 km || 
|-id=014 bgcolor=#fefefe
| 74014 ||  || — || March 31, 1998 || Socorro || LINEAR || — || align=right | 2.6 km || 
|-id=015 bgcolor=#fefefe
| 74015 ||  || — || March 22, 1998 || Socorro || LINEAR || — || align=right | 1.8 km || 
|-id=016 bgcolor=#d6d6d6
| 74016 ||  || — || March 28, 1998 || Socorro || LINEAR || 3:2 || align=right | 11 km || 
|-id=017 bgcolor=#E9E9E9
| 74017 ||  || — || March 28, 1998 || Socorro || LINEAR || BAR || align=right | 2.5 km || 
|-id=018 bgcolor=#fefefe
| 74018 ||  || — || March 29, 1998 || Socorro || LINEAR || MAS || align=right | 1.6 km || 
|-id=019 bgcolor=#fefefe
| 74019 || 1998 GY || — || April 2, 1998 || Woomera || F. B. Zoltowski || — || align=right | 1.6 km || 
|-id=020 bgcolor=#fefefe
| 74020 ||  || — || April 2, 1998 || La Silla || E. W. Elst || — || align=right | 2.5 km || 
|-id=021 bgcolor=#fefefe
| 74021 ||  || — || April 19, 1998 || Stroncone || Santa Lucia Obs. || — || align=right | 1.5 km || 
|-id=022 bgcolor=#fefefe
| 74022 ||  || — || April 18, 1998 || Kitt Peak || Spacewatch || FLO || align=right | 1.1 km || 
|-id=023 bgcolor=#fefefe
| 74023 ||  || — || April 21, 1998 || Kitt Peak || Spacewatch || FLO || align=right | 1.3 km || 
|-id=024 bgcolor=#fefefe
| 74024 Hrabě ||  ||  || April 23, 1998 || Kleť || M. Tichý, J. Tichá || MAS || align=right | 1.6 km || 
|-id=025 bgcolor=#fefefe
| 74025 ||  || — || April 21, 1998 || Caussols || ODAS || — || align=right | 2.1 km || 
|-id=026 bgcolor=#fefefe
| 74026 ||  || — || April 22, 1998 || Woomera || F. B. Zoltowski || — || align=right | 1.9 km || 
|-id=027 bgcolor=#fefefe
| 74027 ||  || — || April 18, 1998 || Socorro || LINEAR || — || align=right | 1.7 km || 
|-id=028 bgcolor=#fefefe
| 74028 ||  || — || April 18, 1998 || Socorro || LINEAR || ERI || align=right | 3.9 km || 
|-id=029 bgcolor=#fefefe
| 74029 ||  || — || April 18, 1998 || Socorro || LINEAR || V || align=right | 1.6 km || 
|-id=030 bgcolor=#fefefe
| 74030 ||  || — || April 20, 1998 || Socorro || LINEAR || V || align=right | 1.4 km || 
|-id=031 bgcolor=#fefefe
| 74031 ||  || — || April 20, 1998 || Socorro || LINEAR || NYS || align=right | 1.3 km || 
|-id=032 bgcolor=#fefefe
| 74032 ||  || — || April 22, 1998 || Kitt Peak || Spacewatch || FLO || align=right | 1.8 km || 
|-id=033 bgcolor=#fefefe
| 74033 ||  || — || April 22, 1998 || Kitt Peak || Spacewatch || — || align=right | 1.6 km || 
|-id=034 bgcolor=#fefefe
| 74034 ||  || — || April 20, 1998 || Socorro || LINEAR || — || align=right | 1.8 km || 
|-id=035 bgcolor=#E9E9E9
| 74035 ||  || — || April 20, 1998 || Socorro || LINEAR || — || align=right | 1.9 km || 
|-id=036 bgcolor=#fefefe
| 74036 ||  || — || April 20, 1998 || Socorro || LINEAR || FLO || align=right | 1.4 km || 
|-id=037 bgcolor=#fefefe
| 74037 ||  || — || April 21, 1998 || Socorro || LINEAR || — || align=right | 1.8 km || 
|-id=038 bgcolor=#fefefe
| 74038 ||  || — || April 21, 1998 || Socorro || LINEAR || MAS || align=right | 1.7 km || 
|-id=039 bgcolor=#fefefe
| 74039 ||  || — || April 21, 1998 || Socorro || LINEAR || — || align=right | 1.4 km || 
|-id=040 bgcolor=#fefefe
| 74040 ||  || — || April 21, 1998 || Socorro || LINEAR || — || align=right | 4.4 km || 
|-id=041 bgcolor=#E9E9E9
| 74041 ||  || — || April 21, 1998 || Socorro || LINEAR || — || align=right | 4.5 km || 
|-id=042 bgcolor=#fefefe
| 74042 ||  || — || April 21, 1998 || Socorro || LINEAR || — || align=right | 1.8 km || 
|-id=043 bgcolor=#fefefe
| 74043 ||  || — || April 21, 1998 || Socorro || LINEAR || V || align=right | 1.7 km || 
|-id=044 bgcolor=#fefefe
| 74044 ||  || — || April 21, 1998 || Socorro || LINEAR || — || align=right | 5.5 km || 
|-id=045 bgcolor=#fefefe
| 74045 ||  || — || April 25, 1998 || La Silla || E. W. Elst || — || align=right | 1.7 km || 
|-id=046 bgcolor=#fefefe
| 74046 ||  || — || April 25, 1998 || La Silla || E. W. Elst || NYS || align=right | 2.0 km || 
|-id=047 bgcolor=#fefefe
| 74047 ||  || — || April 23, 1998 || Socorro || LINEAR || — || align=right | 2.1 km || 
|-id=048 bgcolor=#fefefe
| 74048 ||  || — || April 23, 1998 || Socorro || LINEAR || FLO || align=right | 1.3 km || 
|-id=049 bgcolor=#fefefe
| 74049 ||  || — || April 23, 1998 || Socorro || LINEAR || FLO || align=right | 1.7 km || 
|-id=050 bgcolor=#fefefe
| 74050 ||  || — || April 18, 1998 || Socorro || LINEAR || — || align=right | 1.5 km || 
|-id=051 bgcolor=#d6d6d6
| 74051 ||  || — || April 20, 1998 || Kitt Peak || Spacewatch || 3:2 || align=right | 8.4 km || 
|-id=052 bgcolor=#fefefe
| 74052 ||  || — || May 1, 1998 || Haleakala || NEAT || V || align=right | 2.3 km || 
|-id=053 bgcolor=#fefefe
| 74053 ||  || — || May 6, 1998 || Caussols || ODAS || V || align=right | 1.5 km || 
|-id=054 bgcolor=#d6d6d6
| 74054 ||  || — || May 1, 1998 || Socorro || LINEAR || 3:2 || align=right | 11 km || 
|-id=055 bgcolor=#fefefe
| 74055 ||  || — || May 22, 1998 || Anderson Mesa || LONEOS || — || align=right | 3.6 km || 
|-id=056 bgcolor=#fefefe
| 74056 ||  || — || May 28, 1998 || Prescott || P. G. Comba || — || align=right | 2.4 km || 
|-id=057 bgcolor=#fefefe
| 74057 ||  || — || May 22, 1998 || Socorro || LINEAR || — || align=right | 1.7 km || 
|-id=058 bgcolor=#fefefe
| 74058 ||  || — || May 22, 1998 || Socorro || LINEAR || — || align=right | 1.5 km || 
|-id=059 bgcolor=#fefefe
| 74059 ||  || — || May 22, 1998 || Socorro || LINEAR || NYS || align=right | 1.5 km || 
|-id=060 bgcolor=#fefefe
| 74060 ||  || — || May 22, 1998 || Socorro || LINEAR || — || align=right | 1.4 km || 
|-id=061 bgcolor=#fefefe
| 74061 ||  || — || May 22, 1998 || Socorro || LINEAR || — || align=right | 1.8 km || 
|-id=062 bgcolor=#fefefe
| 74062 ||  || — || May 22, 1998 || Socorro || LINEAR || — || align=right | 1.8 km || 
|-id=063 bgcolor=#E9E9E9
| 74063 ||  || — || May 22, 1998 || Socorro || LINEAR || — || align=right | 2.5 km || 
|-id=064 bgcolor=#fefefe
| 74064 ||  || — || May 26, 1998 || Kitt Peak || Spacewatch || — || align=right | 1.7 km || 
|-id=065 bgcolor=#E9E9E9
| 74065 ||  || — || May 23, 1998 || Socorro || LINEAR || MIT || align=right | 5.4 km || 
|-id=066 bgcolor=#fefefe
| 74066 ||  || — || May 22, 1998 || Socorro || LINEAR || NYS || align=right | 2.0 km || 
|-id=067 bgcolor=#E9E9E9
| 74067 ||  || — || June 16, 1998 || Kitt Peak || Spacewatch || BRU || align=right | 8.5 km || 
|-id=068 bgcolor=#fefefe
| 74068 ||  || — || June 22, 1998 || Prescott || P. G. Comba || FLO || align=right | 1.5 km || 
|-id=069 bgcolor=#fefefe
| 74069 ||  || — || June 22, 1998 || Woomera || F. B. Zoltowski || — || align=right | 2.4 km || 
|-id=070 bgcolor=#E9E9E9
| 74070 ||  || — || June 19, 1998 || Socorro || LINEAR || MIT || align=right | 4.8 km || 
|-id=071 bgcolor=#fefefe
| 74071 ||  || — || June 19, 1998 || Socorro || LINEAR || — || align=right | 2.2 km || 
|-id=072 bgcolor=#E9E9E9
| 74072 ||  || — || June 19, 1998 || Socorro || LINEAR || — || align=right | 2.4 km || 
|-id=073 bgcolor=#E9E9E9
| 74073 ||  || — || June 24, 1998 || Socorro || LINEAR || — || align=right | 3.2 km || 
|-id=074 bgcolor=#E9E9E9
| 74074 ||  || — || June 24, 1998 || Socorro || LINEAR || — || align=right | 2.4 km || 
|-id=075 bgcolor=#E9E9E9
| 74075 ||  || — || June 24, 1998 || Socorro || LINEAR || — || align=right | 3.5 km || 
|-id=076 bgcolor=#E9E9E9
| 74076 ||  || — || June 24, 1998 || Socorro || LINEAR || — || align=right | 2.5 km || 
|-id=077 bgcolor=#E9E9E9
| 74077 ||  || — || June 28, 1998 || La Silla || E. W. Elst || — || align=right | 2.3 km || 
|-id=078 bgcolor=#E9E9E9
| 74078 || 1998 NP || — || July 3, 1998 || Woomera || F. B. Zoltowski || EUN || align=right | 2.6 km || 
|-id=079 bgcolor=#fefefe
| 74079 || 1998 NS || — || July 11, 1998 || Woomera || F. B. Zoltowski || — || align=right | 2.6 km || 
|-id=080 bgcolor=#E9E9E9
| 74080 || 1998 OW || — || July 20, 1998 || Caussols || ODAS || RAF || align=right | 2.3 km || 
|-id=081 bgcolor=#fefefe
| 74081 ||  || — || July 24, 1998 || Haleakala || NEAT || — || align=right | 2.7 km || 
|-id=082 bgcolor=#fefefe
| 74082 ||  || — || July 23, 1998 || Caussols || ODAS || — || align=right | 2.0 km || 
|-id=083 bgcolor=#E9E9E9
| 74083 ||  || — || July 30, 1998 || Višnjan Observatory || Višnjan Obs. || EUN || align=right | 2.6 km || 
|-id=084 bgcolor=#E9E9E9
| 74084 ||  || — || July 26, 1998 || La Silla || E. W. Elst || — || align=right | 3.1 km || 
|-id=085 bgcolor=#E9E9E9
| 74085 ||  || — || July 22, 1998 || Reedy Creek || J. Broughton || — || align=right | 2.9 km || 
|-id=086 bgcolor=#E9E9E9
| 74086 ||  || — || July 28, 1998 || Reedy Creek || J. Broughton || — || align=right | 2.8 km || 
|-id=087 bgcolor=#E9E9E9
| 74087 ||  || — || July 26, 1998 || La Silla || E. W. Elst || EUN || align=right | 2.8 km || 
|-id=088 bgcolor=#E9E9E9
| 74088 ||  || — || July 26, 1998 || La Silla || E. W. Elst || — || align=right | 2.2 km || 
|-id=089 bgcolor=#E9E9E9
| 74089 ||  || — || July 20, 1998 || Haleakala || NEAT || — || align=right | 4.1 km || 
|-id=090 bgcolor=#fefefe
| 74090 || 1998 QU || — || August 18, 1998 || Majorca || Á. López J., R. Pacheco || V || align=right | 1.9 km || 
|-id=091 bgcolor=#E9E9E9
| 74091 ||  || — || August 17, 1998 || Socorro || LINEAR || — || align=right | 11 km || 
|-id=092 bgcolor=#E9E9E9
| 74092 ||  || — || August 22, 1998 || Xinglong || SCAP || — || align=right | 3.5 km || 
|-id=093 bgcolor=#fefefe
| 74093 ||  || — || August 24, 1998 || Caussols || ODAS || PHO || align=right | 3.6 km || 
|-id=094 bgcolor=#E9E9E9
| 74094 ||  || — || August 17, 1998 || Socorro || LINEAR || EUN || align=right | 4.3 km || 
|-id=095 bgcolor=#E9E9E9
| 74095 ||  || — || August 17, 1998 || Socorro || LINEAR || GEF || align=right | 2.9 km || 
|-id=096 bgcolor=#fefefe
| 74096 ||  || — || August 17, 1998 || Socorro || LINEAR || NYS || align=right | 1.8 km || 
|-id=097 bgcolor=#E9E9E9
| 74097 ||  || — || August 17, 1998 || Bergisch Gladbach || W. Bickel || ADE || align=right | 5.1 km || 
|-id=098 bgcolor=#E9E9E9
| 74098 ||  || — || August 17, 1998 || Socorro || LINEAR || MAR || align=right | 3.0 km || 
|-id=099 bgcolor=#E9E9E9
| 74099 ||  || — || August 17, 1998 || Socorro || LINEAR || — || align=right | 3.0 km || 
|-id=100 bgcolor=#E9E9E9
| 74100 ||  || — || August 25, 1998 || Višnjan Observatory || Višnjan Obs. || — || align=right | 7.5 km || 
|}

74101–74200 

|-bgcolor=#E9E9E9
| 74101 ||  || — || August 17, 1998 || Socorro || LINEAR || — || align=right | 5.1 km || 
|-id=102 bgcolor=#fefefe
| 74102 ||  || — || August 17, 1998 || Socorro || LINEAR || NYS || align=right | 2.0 km || 
|-id=103 bgcolor=#fefefe
| 74103 ||  || — || August 17, 1998 || Socorro || LINEAR || — || align=right | 2.7 km || 
|-id=104 bgcolor=#E9E9E9
| 74104 ||  || — || August 17, 1998 || Socorro || LINEAR || — || align=right | 3.2 km || 
|-id=105 bgcolor=#E9E9E9
| 74105 ||  || — || August 17, 1998 || Socorro || LINEAR || — || align=right | 5.5 km || 
|-id=106 bgcolor=#E9E9E9
| 74106 ||  || — || August 17, 1998 || Socorro || LINEAR || MAR || align=right | 2.4 km || 
|-id=107 bgcolor=#fefefe
| 74107 ||  || — || August 17, 1998 || Socorro || LINEAR || V || align=right | 3.2 km || 
|-id=108 bgcolor=#fefefe
| 74108 ||  || — || August 17, 1998 || Socorro || LINEAR || FLO || align=right | 2.8 km || 
|-id=109 bgcolor=#E9E9E9
| 74109 ||  || — || August 17, 1998 || Socorro || LINEAR || — || align=right | 3.4 km || 
|-id=110 bgcolor=#E9E9E9
| 74110 ||  || — || August 17, 1998 || Socorro || LINEAR || — || align=right | 6.6 km || 
|-id=111 bgcolor=#fefefe
| 74111 ||  || — || August 17, 1998 || Socorro || LINEAR || NYS || align=right | 1.1 km || 
|-id=112 bgcolor=#fefefe
| 74112 ||  || — || August 17, 1998 || Socorro || LINEAR || — || align=right | 3.1 km || 
|-id=113 bgcolor=#E9E9E9
| 74113 ||  || — || August 17, 1998 || Socorro || LINEAR || — || align=right | 5.2 km || 
|-id=114 bgcolor=#E9E9E9
| 74114 ||  || — || August 17, 1998 || Socorro || LINEAR || — || align=right | 4.6 km || 
|-id=115 bgcolor=#E9E9E9
| 74115 ||  || — || August 17, 1998 || Socorro || LINEAR || — || align=right | 4.2 km || 
|-id=116 bgcolor=#E9E9E9
| 74116 ||  || — || August 17, 1998 || Socorro || LINEAR || — || align=right | 4.7 km || 
|-id=117 bgcolor=#E9E9E9
| 74117 ||  || — || August 17, 1998 || Socorro || LINEAR || — || align=right | 4.7 km || 
|-id=118 bgcolor=#E9E9E9
| 74118 ||  || — || August 17, 1998 || Socorro || LINEAR || — || align=right | 6.4 km || 
|-id=119 bgcolor=#fefefe
| 74119 ||  || — || August 17, 1998 || Socorro || LINEAR || — || align=right | 8.3 km || 
|-id=120 bgcolor=#E9E9E9
| 74120 ||  || — || August 20, 1998 || Anderson Mesa || LONEOS || — || align=right | 3.0 km || 
|-id=121 bgcolor=#fefefe
| 74121 ||  || — || August 28, 1998 || Woomera || F. B. Zoltowski || — || align=right | 2.1 km || 
|-id=122 bgcolor=#E9E9E9
| 74122 ||  || — || August 27, 1998 || Anderson Mesa || LONEOS || — || align=right | 3.2 km || 
|-id=123 bgcolor=#E9E9E9
| 74123 ||  || — || August 28, 1998 || Socorro || LINEAR || — || align=right | 4.9 km || 
|-id=124 bgcolor=#E9E9E9
| 74124 ||  || — || August 30, 1998 || Kitt Peak || Spacewatch || HEN || align=right | 5.1 km || 
|-id=125 bgcolor=#E9E9E9
| 74125 ||  || — || August 26, 1998 || Kitt Peak || Spacewatch || — || align=right | 2.4 km || 
|-id=126 bgcolor=#fefefe
| 74126 ||  || — || August 23, 1998 || Anderson Mesa || LONEOS || V || align=right | 1.6 km || 
|-id=127 bgcolor=#E9E9E9
| 74127 ||  || — || August 23, 1998 || Anderson Mesa || LONEOS || — || align=right | 3.1 km || 
|-id=128 bgcolor=#E9E9E9
| 74128 ||  || — || August 24, 1998 || Socorro || LINEAR || EUN || align=right | 2.6 km || 
|-id=129 bgcolor=#E9E9E9
| 74129 ||  || — || August 24, 1998 || Socorro || LINEAR || EUN || align=right | 2.2 km || 
|-id=130 bgcolor=#E9E9E9
| 74130 ||  || — || August 24, 1998 || Socorro || LINEAR || EUN || align=right | 2.7 km || 
|-id=131 bgcolor=#E9E9E9
| 74131 ||  || — || August 24, 1998 || Socorro || LINEAR || MAR || align=right | 2.8 km || 
|-id=132 bgcolor=#fefefe
| 74132 ||  || — || August 24, 1998 || Socorro || LINEAR || — || align=right | 2.1 km || 
|-id=133 bgcolor=#E9E9E9
| 74133 ||  || — || August 24, 1998 || Socorro || LINEAR || — || align=right | 2.8 km || 
|-id=134 bgcolor=#E9E9E9
| 74134 ||  || — || August 24, 1998 || Socorro || LINEAR || — || align=right | 2.7 km || 
|-id=135 bgcolor=#E9E9E9
| 74135 ||  || — || August 24, 1998 || Socorro || LINEAR || — || align=right | 3.1 km || 
|-id=136 bgcolor=#E9E9E9
| 74136 ||  || — || August 24, 1998 || Socorro || LINEAR || EUN || align=right | 2.7 km || 
|-id=137 bgcolor=#E9E9E9
| 74137 ||  || — || August 24, 1998 || Socorro || LINEAR || — || align=right | 4.2 km || 
|-id=138 bgcolor=#E9E9E9
| 74138 ||  || — || August 24, 1998 || Socorro || LINEAR || — || align=right | 3.7 km || 
|-id=139 bgcolor=#E9E9E9
| 74139 ||  || — || August 24, 1998 || Socorro || LINEAR || — || align=right | 5.9 km || 
|-id=140 bgcolor=#E9E9E9
| 74140 ||  || — || August 24, 1998 || Socorro || LINEAR || — || align=right | 6.5 km || 
|-id=141 bgcolor=#E9E9E9
| 74141 ||  || — || August 24, 1998 || Socorro || LINEAR || — || align=right | 4.8 km || 
|-id=142 bgcolor=#E9E9E9
| 74142 ||  || — || August 24, 1998 || Socorro || LINEAR || — || align=right | 6.4 km || 
|-id=143 bgcolor=#E9E9E9
| 74143 ||  || — || August 24, 1998 || Socorro || LINEAR || HNS || align=right | 4.7 km || 
|-id=144 bgcolor=#E9E9E9
| 74144 ||  || — || August 24, 1998 || Socorro || LINEAR || — || align=right | 4.1 km || 
|-id=145 bgcolor=#E9E9E9
| 74145 ||  || — || August 24, 1998 || Socorro || LINEAR || — || align=right | 7.6 km || 
|-id=146 bgcolor=#E9E9E9
| 74146 ||  || — || August 24, 1998 || Socorro || LINEAR || MIT || align=right | 5.2 km || 
|-id=147 bgcolor=#E9E9E9
| 74147 ||  || — || August 24, 1998 || Socorro || LINEAR || — || align=right | 8.0 km || 
|-id=148 bgcolor=#E9E9E9
| 74148 ||  || — || August 24, 1998 || Socorro || LINEAR || ADE || align=right | 5.2 km || 
|-id=149 bgcolor=#E9E9E9
| 74149 ||  || — || August 24, 1998 || Socorro || LINEAR || MAR || align=right | 3.6 km || 
|-id=150 bgcolor=#E9E9E9
| 74150 ||  || — || August 24, 1998 || Socorro || LINEAR || — || align=right | 7.1 km || 
|-id=151 bgcolor=#E9E9E9
| 74151 ||  || — || August 24, 1998 || Socorro || LINEAR || — || align=right | 4.2 km || 
|-id=152 bgcolor=#E9E9E9
| 74152 ||  || — || August 24, 1998 || Socorro || LINEAR || — || align=right | 5.7 km || 
|-id=153 bgcolor=#E9E9E9
| 74153 ||  || — || August 24, 1998 || Socorro || LINEAR || — || align=right | 5.6 km || 
|-id=154 bgcolor=#E9E9E9
| 74154 ||  || — || August 28, 1998 || Socorro || LINEAR || — || align=right | 4.2 km || 
|-id=155 bgcolor=#E9E9E9
| 74155 ||  || — || August 28, 1998 || Socorro || LINEAR || EUN || align=right | 5.9 km || 
|-id=156 bgcolor=#E9E9E9
| 74156 ||  || — || August 19, 1998 || Socorro || LINEAR || EUN || align=right | 2.9 km || 
|-id=157 bgcolor=#E9E9E9
| 74157 ||  || — || August 19, 1998 || Socorro || LINEAR || — || align=right | 2.7 km || 
|-id=158 bgcolor=#fefefe
| 74158 ||  || — || August 24, 1998 || Socorro || LINEAR || PHO || align=right | 2.8 km || 
|-id=159 bgcolor=#E9E9E9
| 74159 ||  || — || August 26, 1998 || La Silla || E. W. Elst || — || align=right | 5.1 km || 
|-id=160 bgcolor=#E9E9E9
| 74160 ||  || — || August 26, 1998 || La Silla || E. W. Elst || BAR || align=right | 2.7 km || 
|-id=161 bgcolor=#E9E9E9
| 74161 ||  || — || August 26, 1998 || La Silla || E. W. Elst || MIS || align=right | 4.9 km || 
|-id=162 bgcolor=#fefefe
| 74162 ||  || — || August 26, 1998 || La Silla || E. W. Elst || — || align=right | 3.0 km || 
|-id=163 bgcolor=#E9E9E9
| 74163 ||  || — || August 26, 1998 || La Silla || E. W. Elst || RAF || align=right | 2.0 km || 
|-id=164 bgcolor=#E9E9E9
| 74164 ||  || — || August 26, 1998 || La Silla || E. W. Elst || — || align=right | 2.4 km || 
|-id=165 bgcolor=#E9E9E9
| 74165 ||  || — || August 26, 1998 || La Silla || E. W. Elst || — || align=right | 2.7 km || 
|-id=166 bgcolor=#E9E9E9
| 74166 ||  || — || August 19, 1998 || Haleakala || NEAT || — || align=right | 4.1 km || 
|-id=167 bgcolor=#E9E9E9
| 74167 ||  || — || September 15, 1998 || Caussols || ODAS || INO || align=right | 3.3 km || 
|-id=168 bgcolor=#E9E9E9
| 74168 ||  || — || September 15, 1998 || Caussols || ODAS || HOF || align=right | 5.0 km || 
|-id=169 bgcolor=#E9E9E9
| 74169 ||  || — || September 13, 1998 || Kitt Peak || Spacewatch || — || align=right | 4.9 km || 
|-id=170 bgcolor=#fefefe
| 74170 ||  || — || September 13, 1998 || Kitt Peak || Spacewatch || MAS || align=right | 1.3 km || 
|-id=171 bgcolor=#E9E9E9
| 74171 ||  || — || September 13, 1998 || Anderson Mesa || LONEOS || — || align=right | 4.5 km || 
|-id=172 bgcolor=#E9E9E9
| 74172 ||  || — || September 12, 1998 || Kitt Peak || Spacewatch || — || align=right | 3.3 km || 
|-id=173 bgcolor=#E9E9E9
| 74173 ||  || — || September 12, 1998 || Kitt Peak || Spacewatch || MIS || align=right | 5.0 km || 
|-id=174 bgcolor=#E9E9E9
| 74174 ||  || — || September 13, 1998 || Kitt Peak || Spacewatch || — || align=right | 4.0 km || 
|-id=175 bgcolor=#E9E9E9
| 74175 ||  || — || September 13, 1998 || Kitt Peak || Spacewatch || — || align=right | 3.3 km || 
|-id=176 bgcolor=#E9E9E9
| 74176 ||  || — || September 14, 1998 || Socorro || LINEAR || — || align=right | 2.1 km || 
|-id=177 bgcolor=#E9E9E9
| 74177 ||  || — || September 14, 1998 || Socorro || LINEAR || — || align=right | 3.4 km || 
|-id=178 bgcolor=#E9E9E9
| 74178 ||  || — || September 14, 1998 || Socorro || LINEAR || EUN || align=right | 2.5 km || 
|-id=179 bgcolor=#fefefe
| 74179 ||  || — || September 14, 1998 || Socorro || LINEAR || — || align=right | 2.4 km || 
|-id=180 bgcolor=#E9E9E9
| 74180 ||  || — || September 14, 1998 || Socorro || LINEAR || EUN || align=right | 2.4 km || 
|-id=181 bgcolor=#E9E9E9
| 74181 ||  || — || September 14, 1998 || Socorro || LINEAR || MAR || align=right | 2.4 km || 
|-id=182 bgcolor=#E9E9E9
| 74182 ||  || — || September 14, 1998 || Socorro || LINEAR || — || align=right | 6.3 km || 
|-id=183 bgcolor=#E9E9E9
| 74183 ||  || — || September 14, 1998 || Socorro || LINEAR || — || align=right | 4.8 km || 
|-id=184 bgcolor=#fefefe
| 74184 ||  || — || September 14, 1998 || Socorro || LINEAR || V || align=right | 2.1 km || 
|-id=185 bgcolor=#E9E9E9
| 74185 ||  || — || September 14, 1998 || Socorro || LINEAR || — || align=right | 2.1 km || 
|-id=186 bgcolor=#fefefe
| 74186 ||  || — || September 14, 1998 || Socorro || LINEAR || V || align=right | 2.9 km || 
|-id=187 bgcolor=#E9E9E9
| 74187 ||  || — || September 14, 1998 || Socorro || LINEAR || — || align=right | 2.0 km || 
|-id=188 bgcolor=#E9E9E9
| 74188 ||  || — || September 14, 1998 || Socorro || LINEAR || — || align=right | 2.5 km || 
|-id=189 bgcolor=#E9E9E9
| 74189 ||  || — || September 14, 1998 || Socorro || LINEAR || — || align=right | 4.5 km || 
|-id=190 bgcolor=#E9E9E9
| 74190 ||  || — || September 14, 1998 || Socorro || LINEAR || — || align=right | 2.1 km || 
|-id=191 bgcolor=#E9E9E9
| 74191 ||  || — || September 14, 1998 || Socorro || LINEAR || — || align=right | 4.3 km || 
|-id=192 bgcolor=#E9E9E9
| 74192 ||  || — || September 14, 1998 || Socorro || LINEAR || — || align=right | 2.9 km || 
|-id=193 bgcolor=#E9E9E9
| 74193 ||  || — || September 14, 1998 || Socorro || LINEAR || — || align=right | 2.9 km || 
|-id=194 bgcolor=#E9E9E9
| 74194 ||  || — || September 14, 1998 || Socorro || LINEAR || — || align=right | 5.5 km || 
|-id=195 bgcolor=#E9E9E9
| 74195 ||  || — || September 14, 1998 || Socorro || LINEAR || — || align=right | 2.7 km || 
|-id=196 bgcolor=#fefefe
| 74196 ||  || — || September 14, 1998 || Socorro || LINEAR || NYS || align=right | 2.0 km || 
|-id=197 bgcolor=#fefefe
| 74197 ||  || — || September 14, 1998 || Socorro || LINEAR || NYS || align=right | 1.7 km || 
|-id=198 bgcolor=#E9E9E9
| 74198 ||  || — || September 14, 1998 || Socorro || LINEAR || ADE || align=right | 2.3 km || 
|-id=199 bgcolor=#E9E9E9
| 74199 ||  || — || September 14, 1998 || Socorro || LINEAR || — || align=right | 2.9 km || 
|-id=200 bgcolor=#E9E9E9
| 74200 ||  || — || September 14, 1998 || Socorro || LINEAR || — || align=right | 2.7 km || 
|}

74201–74300 

|-bgcolor=#E9E9E9
| 74201 ||  || — || September 14, 1998 || Socorro || LINEAR || — || align=right | 2.2 km || 
|-id=202 bgcolor=#fefefe
| 74202 ||  || — || September 14, 1998 || Socorro || LINEAR || — || align=right | 2.9 km || 
|-id=203 bgcolor=#fefefe
| 74203 ||  || — || September 14, 1998 || Socorro || LINEAR || — || align=right | 3.6 km || 
|-id=204 bgcolor=#E9E9E9
| 74204 ||  || — || September 14, 1998 || Socorro || LINEAR || — || align=right | 4.5 km || 
|-id=205 bgcolor=#E9E9E9
| 74205 ||  || — || September 14, 1998 || Socorro || LINEAR || — || align=right | 3.5 km || 
|-id=206 bgcolor=#E9E9E9
| 74206 ||  || — || September 14, 1998 || Socorro || LINEAR || XIZ || align=right | 2.6 km || 
|-id=207 bgcolor=#E9E9E9
| 74207 ||  || — || September 14, 1998 || Socorro || LINEAR || — || align=right | 2.4 km || 
|-id=208 bgcolor=#E9E9E9
| 74208 ||  || — || September 14, 1998 || Socorro || LINEAR || MAR || align=right | 2.4 km || 
|-id=209 bgcolor=#E9E9E9
| 74209 ||  || — || September 14, 1998 || Socorro || LINEAR || — || align=right | 4.1 km || 
|-id=210 bgcolor=#E9E9E9
| 74210 ||  || — || September 14, 1998 || Socorro || LINEAR || — || align=right | 6.5 km || 
|-id=211 bgcolor=#E9E9E9
| 74211 ||  || — || September 14, 1998 || Socorro || LINEAR || MIS || align=right | 4.3 km || 
|-id=212 bgcolor=#E9E9E9
| 74212 ||  || — || September 14, 1998 || Socorro || LINEAR || — || align=right | 5.1 km || 
|-id=213 bgcolor=#fefefe
| 74213 ||  || — || September 14, 1998 || Socorro || LINEAR || — || align=right | 3.5 km || 
|-id=214 bgcolor=#E9E9E9
| 74214 ||  || — || September 14, 1998 || Socorro || LINEAR || EUN || align=right | 3.5 km || 
|-id=215 bgcolor=#E9E9E9
| 74215 ||  || — || September 14, 1998 || Socorro || LINEAR || — || align=right | 5.6 km || 
|-id=216 bgcolor=#E9E9E9
| 74216 ||  || — || September 14, 1998 || Socorro || LINEAR || — || align=right | 3.5 km || 
|-id=217 bgcolor=#FA8072
| 74217 ||  || — || September 14, 1998 || Socorro || LINEAR || — || align=right | 3.4 km || 
|-id=218 bgcolor=#fefefe
| 74218 ||  || — || September 14, 1998 || Socorro || LINEAR || — || align=right | 3.4 km || 
|-id=219 bgcolor=#fefefe
| 74219 ||  || — || September 14, 1998 || Socorro || LINEAR || V || align=right | 4.0 km || 
|-id=220 bgcolor=#E9E9E9
| 74220 ||  || — || September 14, 1998 || Socorro || LINEAR || — || align=right | 5.2 km || 
|-id=221 bgcolor=#E9E9E9
| 74221 ||  || — || September 14, 1998 || Socorro || LINEAR || — || align=right | 4.6 km || 
|-id=222 bgcolor=#E9E9E9
| 74222 ||  || — || September 15, 1998 || Anderson Mesa || LONEOS || — || align=right | 1.8 km || 
|-id=223 bgcolor=#E9E9E9
| 74223 ||  || — || September 15, 1998 || Anderson Mesa || LONEOS || MRX || align=right | 2.1 km || 
|-id=224 bgcolor=#E9E9E9
| 74224 ||  || — || September 16, 1998 || Caussols || ODAS || EUN || align=right | 4.0 km || 
|-id=225 bgcolor=#E9E9E9
| 74225 ||  || — || September 17, 1998 || Xinglong || SCAP || — || align=right | 4.2 km || 
|-id=226 bgcolor=#E9E9E9
| 74226 ||  || — || September 21, 1998 || Goodricke-Pigott || R. A. Tucker || — || align=right | 2.9 km || 
|-id=227 bgcolor=#E9E9E9
| 74227 ||  || — || September 23, 1998 || Caussols || ODAS || WIT || align=right | 2.7 km || 
|-id=228 bgcolor=#E9E9E9
| 74228 ||  || — || September 16, 1998 || Kitt Peak || Spacewatch || — || align=right | 5.6 km || 
|-id=229 bgcolor=#E9E9E9
| 74229 ||  || — || September 17, 1998 || Kitt Peak || Spacewatch || HEN || align=right | 2.0 km || 
|-id=230 bgcolor=#E9E9E9
| 74230 ||  || — || September 17, 1998 || Anderson Mesa || LONEOS || — || align=right | 1.9 km || 
|-id=231 bgcolor=#E9E9E9
| 74231 ||  || — || September 17, 1998 || Anderson Mesa || LONEOS || — || align=right | 3.2 km || 
|-id=232 bgcolor=#d6d6d6
| 74232 ||  || — || September 24, 1998 || Ondřejov || P. Pravec || — || align=right | 5.3 km || 
|-id=233 bgcolor=#E9E9E9
| 74233 ||  || — || September 24, 1998 || Caussols || ODAS || — || align=right | 3.5 km || 
|-id=234 bgcolor=#E9E9E9
| 74234 ||  || — || September 20, 1998 || Kitt Peak || Spacewatch || — || align=right | 2.1 km || 
|-id=235 bgcolor=#E9E9E9
| 74235 ||  || — || September 27, 1998 || Kitt Peak || Spacewatch || — || align=right | 2.5 km || 
|-id=236 bgcolor=#E9E9E9
| 74236 ||  || — || September 25, 1998 || Kitt Peak || Spacewatch || — || align=right | 2.4 km || 
|-id=237 bgcolor=#E9E9E9
| 74237 ||  || — || September 26, 1998 || Kitt Peak || Spacewatch || — || align=right | 3.1 km || 
|-id=238 bgcolor=#E9E9E9
| 74238 ||  || — || September 27, 1998 || Kitt Peak || Spacewatch || — || align=right | 3.2 km || 
|-id=239 bgcolor=#E9E9E9
| 74239 ||  || — || September 27, 1998 || Kitt Peak || Spacewatch || — || align=right | 2.7 km || 
|-id=240 bgcolor=#E9E9E9
| 74240 ||  || — || September 30, 1998 || Kitt Peak || Spacewatch || — || align=right | 3.9 km || 
|-id=241 bgcolor=#E9E9E9
| 74241 ||  || — || September 16, 1998 || Anderson Mesa || LONEOS || — || align=right | 3.5 km || 
|-id=242 bgcolor=#E9E9E9
| 74242 ||  || — || September 16, 1998 || Anderson Mesa || LONEOS || — || align=right | 2.9 km || 
|-id=243 bgcolor=#E9E9E9
| 74243 ||  || — || September 16, 1998 || Anderson Mesa || LONEOS || — || align=right | 5.0 km || 
|-id=244 bgcolor=#E9E9E9
| 74244 ||  || — || September 17, 1998 || Anderson Mesa || LONEOS || — || align=right | 3.6 km || 
|-id=245 bgcolor=#fefefe
| 74245 ||  || — || September 17, 1998 || Anderson Mesa || LONEOS || — || align=right | 8.3 km || 
|-id=246 bgcolor=#E9E9E9
| 74246 ||  || — || September 23, 1998 || Xinglong || SCAP || — || align=right | 2.3 km || 
|-id=247 bgcolor=#E9E9E9
| 74247 ||  || — || September 20, 1998 || La Silla || E. W. Elst || WIT || align=right | 2.2 km || 
|-id=248 bgcolor=#E9E9E9
| 74248 ||  || — || September 20, 1998 || La Silla || E. W. Elst || — || align=right | 3.3 km || 
|-id=249 bgcolor=#E9E9E9
| 74249 ||  || — || September 20, 1998 || La Silla || E. W. Elst || RAF || align=right | 4.2 km || 
|-id=250 bgcolor=#E9E9E9
| 74250 ||  || — || September 20, 1998 || La Silla || E. W. Elst || DOR || align=right | 6.9 km || 
|-id=251 bgcolor=#E9E9E9
| 74251 ||  || — || September 20, 1998 || La Silla || E. W. Elst || — || align=right | 3.5 km || 
|-id=252 bgcolor=#fefefe
| 74252 ||  || — || September 21, 1998 || La Silla || E. W. Elst || V || align=right | 2.5 km || 
|-id=253 bgcolor=#E9E9E9
| 74253 ||  || — || September 21, 1998 || La Silla || E. W. Elst || — || align=right | 8.5 km || 
|-id=254 bgcolor=#E9E9E9
| 74254 ||  || — || September 21, 1998 || La Silla || E. W. Elst || — || align=right | 4.2 km || 
|-id=255 bgcolor=#E9E9E9
| 74255 ||  || — || September 19, 1998 || Socorro || LINEAR || — || align=right | 3.4 km || 
|-id=256 bgcolor=#E9E9E9
| 74256 ||  || — || September 26, 1998 || Socorro || LINEAR || GEF || align=right | 2.8 km || 
|-id=257 bgcolor=#E9E9E9
| 74257 ||  || — || September 26, 1998 || Socorro || LINEAR || — || align=right | 1.8 km || 
|-id=258 bgcolor=#E9E9E9
| 74258 ||  || — || September 26, 1998 || Socorro || LINEAR || PAD || align=right | 3.6 km || 
|-id=259 bgcolor=#E9E9E9
| 74259 ||  || — || September 26, 1998 || Socorro || LINEAR || — || align=right | 3.1 km || 
|-id=260 bgcolor=#E9E9E9
| 74260 ||  || — || September 26, 1998 || Socorro || LINEAR || — || align=right | 3.3 km || 
|-id=261 bgcolor=#fefefe
| 74261 ||  || — || September 26, 1998 || Socorro || LINEAR || ERI || align=right | 4.9 km || 
|-id=262 bgcolor=#E9E9E9
| 74262 ||  || — || September 26, 1998 || Socorro || LINEAR || AGN || align=right | 3.0 km || 
|-id=263 bgcolor=#fefefe
| 74263 ||  || — || September 26, 1998 || Socorro || LINEAR || — || align=right | 2.5 km || 
|-id=264 bgcolor=#E9E9E9
| 74264 ||  || — || September 26, 1998 || Socorro || LINEAR || — || align=right | 2.2 km || 
|-id=265 bgcolor=#E9E9E9
| 74265 ||  || — || September 26, 1998 || Socorro || LINEAR || — || align=right | 3.9 km || 
|-id=266 bgcolor=#E9E9E9
| 74266 ||  || — || September 26, 1998 || Socorro || LINEAR || — || align=right | 5.5 km || 
|-id=267 bgcolor=#E9E9E9
| 74267 ||  || — || September 26, 1998 || Socorro || LINEAR || EUN || align=right | 3.8 km || 
|-id=268 bgcolor=#E9E9E9
| 74268 ||  || — || September 26, 1998 || Socorro || LINEAR || MIT || align=right | 5.0 km || 
|-id=269 bgcolor=#E9E9E9
| 74269 ||  || — || September 26, 1998 || Socorro || LINEAR || — || align=right | 2.7 km || 
|-id=270 bgcolor=#E9E9E9
| 74270 ||  || — || September 26, 1998 || Socorro || LINEAR || EUN || align=right | 2.8 km || 
|-id=271 bgcolor=#E9E9E9
| 74271 ||  || — || September 26, 1998 || Socorro || LINEAR || — || align=right | 4.5 km || 
|-id=272 bgcolor=#fefefe
| 74272 ||  || — || September 26, 1998 || Socorro || LINEAR || V || align=right | 2.8 km || 
|-id=273 bgcolor=#E9E9E9
| 74273 ||  || — || September 26, 1998 || Socorro || LINEAR || — || align=right | 4.3 km || 
|-id=274 bgcolor=#E9E9E9
| 74274 ||  || — || September 26, 1998 || Socorro || LINEAR || EUN || align=right | 2.8 km || 
|-id=275 bgcolor=#E9E9E9
| 74275 ||  || — || September 26, 1998 || Socorro || LINEAR || DOR || align=right | 5.9 km || 
|-id=276 bgcolor=#E9E9E9
| 74276 ||  || — || September 26, 1998 || Socorro || LINEAR || — || align=right | 5.4 km || 
|-id=277 bgcolor=#E9E9E9
| 74277 ||  || — || September 26, 1998 || Socorro || LINEAR || — || align=right | 4.3 km || 
|-id=278 bgcolor=#E9E9E9
| 74278 ||  || — || September 26, 1998 || Socorro || LINEAR || DOR || align=right | 5.5 km || 
|-id=279 bgcolor=#d6d6d6
| 74279 ||  || — || September 26, 1998 || Socorro || LINEAR || — || align=right | 3.5 km || 
|-id=280 bgcolor=#E9E9E9
| 74280 ||  || — || September 26, 1998 || Socorro || LINEAR || — || align=right | 2.9 km || 
|-id=281 bgcolor=#E9E9E9
| 74281 ||  || — || September 26, 1998 || Socorro || LINEAR || — || align=right | 8.1 km || 
|-id=282 bgcolor=#E9E9E9
| 74282 ||  || — || September 26, 1998 || Socorro || LINEAR || — || align=right | 3.1 km || 
|-id=283 bgcolor=#fefefe
| 74283 ||  || — || September 26, 1998 || Socorro || LINEAR || V || align=right | 2.2 km || 
|-id=284 bgcolor=#E9E9E9
| 74284 ||  || — || September 26, 1998 || Socorro || LINEAR || — || align=right | 6.2 km || 
|-id=285 bgcolor=#E9E9E9
| 74285 ||  || — || September 26, 1998 || Socorro || LINEAR || GEF || align=right | 3.2 km || 
|-id=286 bgcolor=#E9E9E9
| 74286 ||  || — || September 26, 1998 || Socorro || LINEAR || — || align=right | 4.3 km || 
|-id=287 bgcolor=#E9E9E9
| 74287 ||  || — || September 26, 1998 || Socorro || LINEAR || — || align=right | 4.9 km || 
|-id=288 bgcolor=#E9E9E9
| 74288 ||  || — || September 26, 1998 || Socorro || LINEAR || — || align=right | 3.2 km || 
|-id=289 bgcolor=#E9E9E9
| 74289 ||  || — || September 26, 1998 || Socorro || LINEAR || — || align=right | 6.2 km || 
|-id=290 bgcolor=#fefefe
| 74290 ||  || — || September 26, 1998 || Socorro || LINEAR || V || align=right | 2.5 km || 
|-id=291 bgcolor=#E9E9E9
| 74291 ||  || — || September 26, 1998 || Socorro || LINEAR || — || align=right | 2.4 km || 
|-id=292 bgcolor=#E9E9E9
| 74292 ||  || — || September 26, 1998 || Socorro || LINEAR || — || align=right | 3.6 km || 
|-id=293 bgcolor=#E9E9E9
| 74293 ||  || — || September 26, 1998 || Socorro || LINEAR || — || align=right | 3.0 km || 
|-id=294 bgcolor=#E9E9E9
| 74294 ||  || — || September 26, 1998 || Socorro || LINEAR || — || align=right | 5.5 km || 
|-id=295 bgcolor=#E9E9E9
| 74295 ||  || — || September 20, 1998 || La Silla || E. W. Elst || — || align=right | 5.6 km || 
|-id=296 bgcolor=#E9E9E9
| 74296 ||  || — || September 20, 1998 || La Silla || E. W. Elst || EUN || align=right | 3.3 km || 
|-id=297 bgcolor=#E9E9E9
| 74297 ||  || — || September 20, 1998 || La Silla || E. W. Elst || — || align=right | 5.4 km || 
|-id=298 bgcolor=#E9E9E9
| 74298 ||  || — || September 26, 1998 || Socorro || LINEAR || HEN || align=right | 2.0 km || 
|-id=299 bgcolor=#E9E9E9
| 74299 ||  || — || September 26, 1998 || Socorro || LINEAR || — || align=right | 6.3 km || 
|-id=300 bgcolor=#E9E9E9
| 74300 ||  || — || September 26, 1998 || Socorro || LINEAR || — || align=right | 2.7 km || 
|}

74301–74400 

|-bgcolor=#E9E9E9
| 74301 ||  || — || September 26, 1998 || Socorro || LINEAR || — || align=right | 4.2 km || 
|-id=302 bgcolor=#E9E9E9
| 74302 ||  || — || October 12, 1998 || Kitt Peak || Spacewatch || — || align=right | 2.7 km || 
|-id=303 bgcolor=#E9E9E9
| 74303 ||  || — || October 14, 1998 || Socorro || LINEAR || EUN || align=right | 2.9 km || 
|-id=304 bgcolor=#d6d6d6
| 74304 ||  || — || October 13, 1998 || Kitt Peak || Spacewatch || — || align=right | 3.3 km || 
|-id=305 bgcolor=#E9E9E9
| 74305 ||  || — || October 13, 1998 || Kitt Peak || Spacewatch || HEN || align=right | 2.5 km || 
|-id=306 bgcolor=#d6d6d6
| 74306 ||  || — || October 15, 1998 || Kitt Peak || Spacewatch || KOR || align=right | 2.0 km || 
|-id=307 bgcolor=#E9E9E9
| 74307 ||  || — || October 10, 1998 || Anderson Mesa || LONEOS || — || align=right | 3.9 km || 
|-id=308 bgcolor=#E9E9E9
| 74308 ||  || — || October 11, 1998 || Anderson Mesa || LONEOS || — || align=right | 3.0 km || 
|-id=309 bgcolor=#E9E9E9
| 74309 ||  || — || October 11, 1998 || Anderson Mesa || LONEOS || — || align=right | 4.1 km || 
|-id=310 bgcolor=#d6d6d6
| 74310 ||  || — || October 14, 1998 || Anderson Mesa || LONEOS || — || align=right | 5.7 km || 
|-id=311 bgcolor=#E9E9E9
| 74311 ||  || — || October 14, 1998 || Anderson Mesa || LONEOS || — || align=right | 2.3 km || 
|-id=312 bgcolor=#d6d6d6
| 74312 ||  || — || October 21, 1998 || Kleť || Kleť Obs. || KOR || align=right | 3.0 km || 
|-id=313 bgcolor=#E9E9E9
| 74313 ||  || — || October 18, 1998 || Gekko || T. Kagawa || — || align=right | 3.6 km || 
|-id=314 bgcolor=#E9E9E9
| 74314 ||  || — || October 23, 1998 || Višnjan Observatory || K. Korlević || — || align=right | 4.7 km || 
|-id=315 bgcolor=#d6d6d6
| 74315 ||  || — || October 17, 1998 || Kitt Peak || Spacewatch || — || align=right | 6.0 km || 
|-id=316 bgcolor=#fefefe
| 74316 ||  || — || October 24, 1998 || Višnjan Observatory || K. Korlević || V || align=right | 3.0 km || 
|-id=317 bgcolor=#E9E9E9
| 74317 ||  || — || October 21, 1998 || Caussols || ODAS || HEN || align=right | 1.9 km || 
|-id=318 bgcolor=#E9E9E9
| 74318 ||  || — || October 22, 1998 || Caussols || ODAS || ADE || align=right | 7.3 km || 
|-id=319 bgcolor=#E9E9E9
| 74319 ||  || — || October 17, 1998 || Xinglong || SCAP || — || align=right | 3.8 km || 
|-id=320 bgcolor=#d6d6d6
| 74320 ||  || — || October 19, 1998 || Xinglong || SCAP || EOS || align=right | 3.8 km || 
|-id=321 bgcolor=#E9E9E9
| 74321 ||  || — || October 28, 1998 || Socorro || LINEAR || GEF || align=right | 3.1 km || 
|-id=322 bgcolor=#E9E9E9
| 74322 ||  || — || October 18, 1998 || La Silla || E. W. Elst || — || align=right | 5.7 km || 
|-id=323 bgcolor=#E9E9E9
| 74323 ||  || — || October 18, 1998 || La Silla || E. W. Elst || ADE || align=right | 7.6 km || 
|-id=324 bgcolor=#E9E9E9
| 74324 ||  || — || October 28, 1998 || Socorro || LINEAR || — || align=right | 7.6 km || 
|-id=325 bgcolor=#E9E9E9
| 74325 ||  || — || October 28, 1998 || Socorro || LINEAR || — || align=right | 2.6 km || 
|-id=326 bgcolor=#E9E9E9
| 74326 ||  || — || October 28, 1998 || Socorro || LINEAR || EUN || align=right | 4.0 km || 
|-id=327 bgcolor=#E9E9E9
| 74327 ||  || — || October 28, 1998 || Socorro || LINEAR || — || align=right | 4.0 km || 
|-id=328 bgcolor=#E9E9E9
| 74328 ||  || — || October 16, 1998 || Socorro || LINEAR || — || align=right | 7.6 km || 
|-id=329 bgcolor=#E9E9E9
| 74329 ||  || — || October 24, 1998 || Kitt Peak || Spacewatch || PAD || align=right | 4.7 km || 
|-id=330 bgcolor=#E9E9E9
| 74330 ||  || — || October 24, 1998 || Kitt Peak || Spacewatch || — || align=right | 1.9 km || 
|-id=331 bgcolor=#d6d6d6
| 74331 ||  || — || October 28, 1998 || Kitt Peak || Spacewatch || ALA || align=right | 7.2 km || 
|-id=332 bgcolor=#E9E9E9
| 74332 ||  || — || November 10, 1998 || Socorro || LINEAR || ADE || align=right | 4.3 km || 
|-id=333 bgcolor=#E9E9E9
| 74333 ||  || — || November 10, 1998 || Socorro || LINEAR || — || align=right | 3.2 km || 
|-id=334 bgcolor=#E9E9E9
| 74334 ||  || — || November 10, 1998 || Socorro || LINEAR || — || align=right | 3.2 km || 
|-id=335 bgcolor=#E9E9E9
| 74335 ||  || — || November 10, 1998 || Socorro || LINEAR || — || align=right | 4.0 km || 
|-id=336 bgcolor=#E9E9E9
| 74336 ||  || — || November 10, 1998 || Socorro || LINEAR || MAR || align=right | 4.2 km || 
|-id=337 bgcolor=#E9E9E9
| 74337 ||  || — || November 10, 1998 || Socorro || LINEAR || — || align=right | 2.7 km || 
|-id=338 bgcolor=#d6d6d6
| 74338 ||  || — || November 10, 1998 || Socorro || LINEAR || — || align=right | 7.3 km || 
|-id=339 bgcolor=#E9E9E9
| 74339 ||  || — || November 10, 1998 || Socorro || LINEAR || — || align=right | 3.6 km || 
|-id=340 bgcolor=#E9E9E9
| 74340 ||  || — || November 10, 1998 || Socorro || LINEAR || — || align=right | 3.3 km || 
|-id=341 bgcolor=#E9E9E9
| 74341 ||  || — || November 10, 1998 || Socorro || LINEAR || EUN || align=right | 2.8 km || 
|-id=342 bgcolor=#E9E9E9
| 74342 ||  || — || November 10, 1998 || Socorro || LINEAR || MRX || align=right | 2.6 km || 
|-id=343 bgcolor=#E9E9E9
| 74343 ||  || — || November 10, 1998 || Socorro || LINEAR || EUN || align=right | 4.6 km || 
|-id=344 bgcolor=#E9E9E9
| 74344 ||  || — || November 14, 1998 || Uenohara || N. Kawasato || GEF || align=right | 2.9 km || 
|-id=345 bgcolor=#E9E9E9
| 74345 ||  || — || November 15, 1998 || Anderson Mesa || LONEOS || — || align=right | 4.7 km || 
|-id=346 bgcolor=#d6d6d6
| 74346 ||  || — || November 14, 1998 || Kitt Peak || Spacewatch || KOR || align=right | 2.5 km || 
|-id=347 bgcolor=#E9E9E9
| 74347 ||  || — || November 10, 1998 || Socorro || LINEAR || — || align=right | 3.4 km || 
|-id=348 bgcolor=#E9E9E9
| 74348 ||  || — || November 14, 1998 || Socorro || LINEAR || — || align=right | 5.5 km || 
|-id=349 bgcolor=#E9E9E9
| 74349 ||  || — || November 14, 1998 || Socorro || LINEAR || — || align=right | 3.5 km || 
|-id=350 bgcolor=#E9E9E9
| 74350 ||  || — || November 14, 1998 || Socorro || LINEAR || MAR || align=right | 4.7 km || 
|-id=351 bgcolor=#E9E9E9
| 74351 ||  || — || November 14, 1998 || Socorro || LINEAR || MAR || align=right | 4.8 km || 
|-id=352 bgcolor=#E9E9E9
| 74352 ||  || — || November 11, 1998 || Višnjan Observatory || Višnjan Obs. || NEM || align=right | 4.6 km || 
|-id=353 bgcolor=#E9E9E9
| 74353 ||  || — || November 18, 1998 || Catalina || CSS || — || align=right | 5.9 km || 
|-id=354 bgcolor=#E9E9E9
| 74354 ||  || — || November 18, 1998 || Kushiro || S. Ueda, H. Kaneda || — || align=right | 4.8 km || 
|-id=355 bgcolor=#d6d6d6
| 74355 ||  || — || November 21, 1998 || Socorro || LINEAR || TEL || align=right | 4.5 km || 
|-id=356 bgcolor=#E9E9E9
| 74356 ||  || — || November 21, 1998 || Socorro || LINEAR || — || align=right | 2.7 km || 
|-id=357 bgcolor=#E9E9E9
| 74357 ||  || — || November 21, 1998 || Socorro || LINEAR || DOR || align=right | 7.0 km || 
|-id=358 bgcolor=#E9E9E9
| 74358 ||  || — || November 21, 1998 || Socorro || LINEAR || CLO || align=right | 5.8 km || 
|-id=359 bgcolor=#E9E9E9
| 74359 ||  || — || November 21, 1998 || Socorro || LINEAR || HOF || align=right | 5.0 km || 
|-id=360 bgcolor=#E9E9E9
| 74360 ||  || — || November 21, 1998 || Socorro || LINEAR || — || align=right | 5.5 km || 
|-id=361 bgcolor=#E9E9E9
| 74361 ||  || — || November 21, 1998 || Socorro || LINEAR || — || align=right | 4.7 km || 
|-id=362 bgcolor=#E9E9E9
| 74362 ||  || — || November 29, 1998 || Woomera || F. B. Zoltowski || EUN || align=right | 3.4 km || 
|-id=363 bgcolor=#E9E9E9
| 74363 ||  || — || November 18, 1998 || Socorro || LINEAR || — || align=right | 4.5 km || 
|-id=364 bgcolor=#d6d6d6
| 74364 ||  || — || November 16, 1998 || Kitt Peak || Spacewatch || THM || align=right | 6.3 km || 
|-id=365 bgcolor=#d6d6d6
| 74365 ||  || — || November 21, 1998 || Kitt Peak || Spacewatch || ALA || align=right | 9.0 km || 
|-id=366 bgcolor=#E9E9E9
| 74366 ||  || — || November 22, 1998 || Kitt Peak || Spacewatch || — || align=right | 2.6 km || 
|-id=367 bgcolor=#E9E9E9
| 74367 ||  || — || November 16, 1998 || Socorro || LINEAR || — || align=right | 4.1 km || 
|-id=368 bgcolor=#d6d6d6
| 74368 ||  || — || November 18, 1998 || Socorro || LINEAR || — || align=right | 3.6 km || 
|-id=369 bgcolor=#E9E9E9
| 74369 ||  || — || November 24, 1998 || Socorro || LINEAR || PAD || align=right | 3.6 km || 
|-id=370 bgcolor=#E9E9E9
| 74370 Kolářjan || 1998 XJ ||  || December 9, 1998 || Kleť || M. Tichý, J. Tichá || — || align=right | 6.4 km || 
|-id=371 bgcolor=#d6d6d6
| 74371 ||  || — || December 7, 1998 || Caussols || ODAS || — || align=right | 4.0 km || 
|-id=372 bgcolor=#d6d6d6
| 74372 ||  || — || December 7, 1998 || Caussols || ODAS || — || align=right | 5.2 km || 
|-id=373 bgcolor=#d6d6d6
| 74373 ||  || — || December 7, 1998 || Caussols || ODAS || EOS || align=right | 4.1 km || 
|-id=374 bgcolor=#E9E9E9
| 74374 ||  || — || December 9, 1998 || Višnjan Observatory || K. Korlević || — || align=right | 3.7 km || 
|-id=375 bgcolor=#E9E9E9
| 74375 ||  || — || December 8, 1998 || Kitt Peak || Spacewatch || AST || align=right | 3.6 km || 
|-id=376 bgcolor=#E9E9E9
| 74376 ||  || — || December 9, 1998 || Kitt Peak || Spacewatch || — || align=right | 2.9 km || 
|-id=377 bgcolor=#E9E9E9
| 74377 ||  || — || December 9, 1998 || Kitt Peak || Spacewatch || — || align=right | 3.2 km || 
|-id=378 bgcolor=#E9E9E9
| 74378 ||  || — || December 8, 1998 || Bédoin || P. Antonini || EUN || align=right | 4.5 km || 
|-id=379 bgcolor=#E9E9E9
| 74379 ||  || — || December 15, 1998 || Višnjan Observatory || K. Korlević || — || align=right | 4.9 km || 
|-id=380 bgcolor=#E9E9E9
| 74380 ||  || — || December 15, 1998 || Caussols || ODAS || HEN || align=right | 1.7 km || 
|-id=381 bgcolor=#E9E9E9
| 74381 ||  || — || December 15, 1998 || Kleť || Kleť Obs. || GEF || align=right | 2.5 km || 
|-id=382 bgcolor=#E9E9E9
| 74382 ||  || — || December 14, 1998 || Socorro || LINEAR || BRU || align=right | 8.3 km || 
|-id=383 bgcolor=#d6d6d6
| 74383 ||  || — || December 8, 1998 || Kitt Peak || Spacewatch || KOR || align=right | 2.6 km || 
|-id=384 bgcolor=#d6d6d6
| 74384 ||  || — || December 10, 1998 || Kitt Peak || Spacewatch || — || align=right | 3.6 km || 
|-id=385 bgcolor=#d6d6d6
| 74385 ||  || — || December 10, 1998 || Kitt Peak || Spacewatch || — || align=right | 5.8 km || 
|-id=386 bgcolor=#E9E9E9
| 74386 ||  || — || December 11, 1998 || Kitt Peak || Spacewatch || — || align=right | 4.4 km || 
|-id=387 bgcolor=#d6d6d6
| 74387 ||  || — || December 12, 1998 || Kitt Peak || Spacewatch || — || align=right | 5.4 km || 
|-id=388 bgcolor=#d6d6d6
| 74388 ||  || — || December 13, 1998 || Kitt Peak || Spacewatch || KOR || align=right | 2.3 km || 
|-id=389 bgcolor=#E9E9E9
| 74389 ||  || — || December 14, 1998 || Kitt Peak || Spacewatch || — || align=right | 3.0 km || 
|-id=390 bgcolor=#d6d6d6
| 74390 ||  || — || December 14, 1998 || Socorro || LINEAR || — || align=right | 8.9 km || 
|-id=391 bgcolor=#E9E9E9
| 74391 ||  || — || December 14, 1998 || Socorro || LINEAR || — || align=right | 5.6 km || 
|-id=392 bgcolor=#E9E9E9
| 74392 ||  || — || December 15, 1998 || Socorro || LINEAR || GEF || align=right | 3.2 km || 
|-id=393 bgcolor=#E9E9E9
| 74393 ||  || — || December 15, 1998 || Socorro || LINEAR || DOR || align=right | 6.1 km || 
|-id=394 bgcolor=#E9E9E9
| 74394 ||  || — || December 15, 1998 || Socorro || LINEAR || — || align=right | 4.9 km || 
|-id=395 bgcolor=#E9E9E9
| 74395 ||  || — || December 15, 1998 || Socorro || LINEAR || — || align=right | 5.3 km || 
|-id=396 bgcolor=#E9E9E9
| 74396 ||  || — || December 14, 1998 || Socorro || LINEAR || PAD || align=right | 5.6 km || 
|-id=397 bgcolor=#E9E9E9
| 74397 ||  || — || December 14, 1998 || Socorro || LINEAR || — || align=right | 3.6 km || 
|-id=398 bgcolor=#d6d6d6
| 74398 ||  || — || December 14, 1998 || Socorro || LINEAR || — || align=right | 9.8 km || 
|-id=399 bgcolor=#E9E9E9
| 74399 ||  || — || December 14, 1998 || Socorro || LINEAR || GEF || align=right | 4.5 km || 
|-id=400 bgcolor=#d6d6d6
| 74400 Streaky ||  ||  || December 11, 1998 || Mérida || O. A. Naranjo || — || align=right | 8.3 km || 
|}

74401–74500 

|-bgcolor=#d6d6d6
| 74401 || 1998 YZ || — || December 16, 1998 || Kleť || Kleť Obs. || — || align=right | 9.0 km || 
|-id=402 bgcolor=#E9E9E9
| 74402 ||  || — || December 19, 1998 || Catalina || CSS || HNS || align=right | 2.6 km || 
|-id=403 bgcolor=#d6d6d6
| 74403 ||  || — || December 21, 1998 || Oizumi || T. Kobayashi || ALA || align=right | 13 km || 
|-id=404 bgcolor=#d6d6d6
| 74404 ||  || — || December 19, 1998 || Uenohara || N. Kawasato || — || align=right | 7.9 km || 
|-id=405 bgcolor=#E9E9E9
| 74405 ||  || — || December 17, 1998 || Kitt Peak || Spacewatch || — || align=right | 7.8 km || 
|-id=406 bgcolor=#d6d6d6
| 74406 ||  || — || December 19, 1998 || Kitt Peak || Spacewatch || — || align=right | 4.0 km || 
|-id=407 bgcolor=#d6d6d6
| 74407 ||  || — || December 26, 1998 || Kitt Peak || Spacewatch || — || align=right | 8.3 km || 
|-id=408 bgcolor=#d6d6d6
| 74408 ||  || — || December 26, 1998 || Kitt Peak || Spacewatch || — || align=right | 5.4 km || 
|-id=409 bgcolor=#d6d6d6
| 74409 ||  || — || December 16, 1998 || Socorro || LINEAR || — || align=right | 4.8 km || 
|-id=410 bgcolor=#fefefe
| 74410 ||  || — || January 11, 1999 || Oizumi || T. Kobayashi || H || align=right | 2.5 km || 
|-id=411 bgcolor=#d6d6d6
| 74411 ||  || — || January 15, 1999 || Kitt Peak || Spacewatch || — || align=right | 6.5 km || 
|-id=412 bgcolor=#d6d6d6
| 74412 ||  || — || January 13, 1999 || Oizumi || T. Kobayashi || — || align=right | 8.6 km || 
|-id=413 bgcolor=#d6d6d6
| 74413 ||  || — || January 6, 1999 || Xinglong || SCAP || — || align=right | 8.7 km || 
|-id=414 bgcolor=#d6d6d6
| 74414 ||  || — || January 10, 1999 || Xinglong || SCAP || — || align=right | 5.2 km || 
|-id=415 bgcolor=#d6d6d6
| 74415 ||  || — || January 10, 1999 || Xinglong || SCAP || EUP || align=right | 8.8 km || 
|-id=416 bgcolor=#E9E9E9
| 74416 ||  || — || January 7, 1999 || Kitt Peak || Spacewatch || GEF || align=right | 2.9 km || 
|-id=417 bgcolor=#d6d6d6
| 74417 ||  || — || January 7, 1999 || Kitt Peak || Spacewatch || — || align=right | 4.6 km || 
|-id=418 bgcolor=#d6d6d6
| 74418 ||  || — || January 7, 1999 || Kitt Peak || Spacewatch || THM || align=right | 5.5 km || 
|-id=419 bgcolor=#d6d6d6
| 74419 ||  || — || January 7, 1999 || Kitt Peak || Spacewatch || HYG || align=right | 7.7 km || 
|-id=420 bgcolor=#d6d6d6
| 74420 ||  || — || January 14, 1999 || Xinglong || SCAP || TIR || align=right | 5.0 km || 
|-id=421 bgcolor=#d6d6d6
| 74421 ||  || — || January 15, 1999 || Caussols || ODAS || THM || align=right | 6.7 km || 
|-id=422 bgcolor=#d6d6d6
| 74422 ||  || — || January 13, 1999 || Kitt Peak || Spacewatch || — || align=right | 8.3 km || 
|-id=423 bgcolor=#d6d6d6
| 74423 ||  || — || January 10, 1999 || Anderson Mesa || LONEOS || — || align=right | 6.3 km || 
|-id=424 bgcolor=#E9E9E9
| 74424 || 1999 BN || — || January 17, 1999 || Modra || P. Kolény, L. Kornoš || — || align=right | 8.1 km || 
|-id=425 bgcolor=#d6d6d6
| 74425 || 1999 BP || — || January 16, 1999 || Višnjan Observatory || Višnjan Obs. || — || align=right | 4.0 km || 
|-id=426 bgcolor=#fefefe
| 74426 ||  || — || January 19, 1999 || Catalina || CSS || H || align=right | 1.5 km || 
|-id=427 bgcolor=#fefefe
| 74427 ||  || — || January 18, 1999 || Oizumi || T. Kobayashi || H || align=right | 1.6 km || 
|-id=428 bgcolor=#d6d6d6
| 74428 ||  || — || January 20, 1999 || Višnjan Observatory || K. Korlević || — || align=right | 4.6 km || 
|-id=429 bgcolor=#E9E9E9
| 74429 ||  || — || January 21, 1999 || Višnjan Observatory || K. Korlević || — || align=right | 3.0 km || 
|-id=430 bgcolor=#d6d6d6
| 74430 ||  || — || January 24, 1999 || Višnjan Observatory || K. Korlević || — || align=right | 5.9 km || 
|-id=431 bgcolor=#d6d6d6
| 74431 ||  || — || January 24, 1999 || Farra d'Isonzo || Farra d'Isonzo || — || align=right | 4.5 km || 
|-id=432 bgcolor=#E9E9E9
| 74432 ||  || — || January 24, 1999 || Črni Vrh || Črni Vrh || — || align=right | 6.4 km || 
|-id=433 bgcolor=#d6d6d6
| 74433 ||  || — || January 24, 1999 || Višnjan Observatory || K. Korlević || — || align=right | 5.2 km || 
|-id=434 bgcolor=#E9E9E9
| 74434 ||  || — || January 16, 1999 || Socorro || LINEAR || — || align=right | 4.3 km || 
|-id=435 bgcolor=#d6d6d6
| 74435 ||  || — || January 16, 1999 || Kitt Peak || Spacewatch || — || align=right | 4.0 km || 
|-id=436 bgcolor=#d6d6d6
| 74436 ||  || — || January 18, 1999 || Kitt Peak || Spacewatch || — || align=right | 5.0 km || 
|-id=437 bgcolor=#d6d6d6
| 74437 || 1999 CR || — || February 5, 1999 || Oizumi || T. Kobayashi || — || align=right | 4.1 km || 
|-id=438 bgcolor=#d6d6d6
| 74438 || 1999 CT || — || February 5, 1999 || Oizumi || T. Kobayashi || — || align=right | 4.5 km || 
|-id=439 bgcolor=#d6d6d6
| 74439 Brenden ||  ||  || February 6, 1999 || Baton Rouge || W. R. Cooney Jr. || — || align=right | 5.9 km || 
|-id=440 bgcolor=#fefefe
| 74440 ||  || — || February 10, 1999 || Socorro || LINEAR || H || align=right | 2.0 km || 
|-id=441 bgcolor=#fefefe
| 74441 ||  || — || February 10, 1999 || Socorro || LINEAR || H || align=right | 1.6 km || 
|-id=442 bgcolor=#d6d6d6
| 74442 ||  || — || February 8, 1999 || Uenohara || N. Kawasato || — || align=right | 6.1 km || 
|-id=443 bgcolor=#fefefe
| 74443 ||  || — || February 12, 1999 || Socorro || LINEAR || H || align=right | 1.4 km || 
|-id=444 bgcolor=#fefefe
| 74444 ||  || — || February 12, 1999 || Socorro || LINEAR || H || align=right | 1.6 km || 
|-id=445 bgcolor=#d6d6d6
| 74445 ||  || — || February 15, 1999 || Višnjan Observatory || K. Korlević || HYG || align=right | 7.4 km || 
|-id=446 bgcolor=#d6d6d6
| 74446 ||  || — || February 10, 1999 || Socorro || LINEAR || — || align=right | 5.5 km || 
|-id=447 bgcolor=#d6d6d6
| 74447 ||  || — || February 10, 1999 || Socorro || LINEAR || EOS || align=right | 5.9 km || 
|-id=448 bgcolor=#E9E9E9
| 74448 ||  || — || February 10, 1999 || Socorro || LINEAR || — || align=right | 3.5 km || 
|-id=449 bgcolor=#d6d6d6
| 74449 ||  || — || February 10, 1999 || Socorro || LINEAR || — || align=right | 6.3 km || 
|-id=450 bgcolor=#d6d6d6
| 74450 ||  || — || February 10, 1999 || Socorro || LINEAR || — || align=right | 4.7 km || 
|-id=451 bgcolor=#d6d6d6
| 74451 ||  || — || February 10, 1999 || Socorro || LINEAR || — || align=right | 5.5 km || 
|-id=452 bgcolor=#d6d6d6
| 74452 ||  || — || February 10, 1999 || Socorro || LINEAR || URS || align=right | 8.9 km || 
|-id=453 bgcolor=#d6d6d6
| 74453 ||  || — || February 10, 1999 || Socorro || LINEAR || — || align=right | 5.1 km || 
|-id=454 bgcolor=#d6d6d6
| 74454 ||  || — || February 10, 1999 || Socorro || LINEAR || — || align=right | 5.8 km || 
|-id=455 bgcolor=#d6d6d6
| 74455 ||  || — || February 10, 1999 || Socorro || LINEAR || — || align=right | 6.4 km || 
|-id=456 bgcolor=#d6d6d6
| 74456 ||  || — || February 10, 1999 || Socorro || LINEAR || — || align=right | 9.5 km || 
|-id=457 bgcolor=#d6d6d6
| 74457 ||  || — || February 10, 1999 || Socorro || LINEAR || EOS || align=right | 5.8 km || 
|-id=458 bgcolor=#d6d6d6
| 74458 ||  || — || February 10, 1999 || Socorro || LINEAR || — || align=right | 8.7 km || 
|-id=459 bgcolor=#d6d6d6
| 74459 ||  || — || February 10, 1999 || Socorro || LINEAR || EOS || align=right | 5.7 km || 
|-id=460 bgcolor=#d6d6d6
| 74460 ||  || — || February 10, 1999 || Socorro || LINEAR || — || align=right | 8.4 km || 
|-id=461 bgcolor=#d6d6d6
| 74461 ||  || — || February 10, 1999 || Socorro || LINEAR || — || align=right | 9.4 km || 
|-id=462 bgcolor=#d6d6d6
| 74462 ||  || — || February 10, 1999 || Socorro || LINEAR || — || align=right | 4.6 km || 
|-id=463 bgcolor=#d6d6d6
| 74463 ||  || — || February 10, 1999 || Socorro || LINEAR || THM || align=right | 5.9 km || 
|-id=464 bgcolor=#d6d6d6
| 74464 ||  || — || February 10, 1999 || Socorro || LINEAR || — || align=right | 5.9 km || 
|-id=465 bgcolor=#d6d6d6
| 74465 ||  || — || February 10, 1999 || Socorro || LINEAR || URS || align=right | 10 km || 
|-id=466 bgcolor=#E9E9E9
| 74466 ||  || — || February 10, 1999 || Socorro || LINEAR || DOR || align=right | 8.4 km || 
|-id=467 bgcolor=#d6d6d6
| 74467 ||  || — || February 10, 1999 || Socorro || LINEAR || — || align=right | 11 km || 
|-id=468 bgcolor=#d6d6d6
| 74468 ||  || — || February 10, 1999 || Socorro || LINEAR || — || align=right | 4.0 km || 
|-id=469 bgcolor=#d6d6d6
| 74469 ||  || — || February 10, 1999 || Socorro || LINEAR || — || align=right | 5.3 km || 
|-id=470 bgcolor=#d6d6d6
| 74470 ||  || — || February 10, 1999 || Socorro || LINEAR || HYG || align=right | 9.1 km || 
|-id=471 bgcolor=#d6d6d6
| 74471 ||  || — || February 10, 1999 || Socorro || LINEAR || EOS || align=right | 4.1 km || 
|-id=472 bgcolor=#d6d6d6
| 74472 ||  || — || February 10, 1999 || Socorro || LINEAR || — || align=right | 5.8 km || 
|-id=473 bgcolor=#d6d6d6
| 74473 ||  || — || February 10, 1999 || Socorro || LINEAR || BRA || align=right | 5.0 km || 
|-id=474 bgcolor=#d6d6d6
| 74474 ||  || — || February 12, 1999 || Socorro || LINEAR || HYG || align=right | 7.4 km || 
|-id=475 bgcolor=#d6d6d6
| 74475 ||  || — || February 12, 1999 || Socorro || LINEAR || — || align=right | 3.5 km || 
|-id=476 bgcolor=#d6d6d6
| 74476 ||  || — || February 12, 1999 || Socorro || LINEAR || — || align=right | 6.7 km || 
|-id=477 bgcolor=#d6d6d6
| 74477 ||  || — || February 12, 1999 || Socorro || LINEAR || URS || align=right | 15 km || 
|-id=478 bgcolor=#d6d6d6
| 74478 ||  || — || February 12, 1999 || Socorro || LINEAR || — || align=right | 7.3 km || 
|-id=479 bgcolor=#d6d6d6
| 74479 ||  || — || February 12, 1999 || Socorro || LINEAR || — || align=right | 5.3 km || 
|-id=480 bgcolor=#d6d6d6
| 74480 ||  || — || February 12, 1999 || Socorro || LINEAR || — || align=right | 6.8 km || 
|-id=481 bgcolor=#E9E9E9
| 74481 ||  || — || February 10, 1999 || Socorro || LINEAR || — || align=right | 7.7 km || 
|-id=482 bgcolor=#d6d6d6
| 74482 ||  || — || February 10, 1999 || Socorro || LINEAR || — || align=right | 5.4 km || 
|-id=483 bgcolor=#E9E9E9
| 74483 ||  || — || February 10, 1999 || Socorro || LINEAR || — || align=right | 7.0 km || 
|-id=484 bgcolor=#d6d6d6
| 74484 ||  || — || February 10, 1999 || Socorro || LINEAR || — || align=right | 7.0 km || 
|-id=485 bgcolor=#d6d6d6
| 74485 ||  || — || February 10, 1999 || Socorro || LINEAR || THM || align=right | 5.5 km || 
|-id=486 bgcolor=#d6d6d6
| 74486 ||  || — || February 10, 1999 || Socorro || LINEAR || EOS || align=right | 5.5 km || 
|-id=487 bgcolor=#d6d6d6
| 74487 ||  || — || February 12, 1999 || Socorro || LINEAR || 7:4 || align=right | 17 km || 
|-id=488 bgcolor=#d6d6d6
| 74488 ||  || — || February 12, 1999 || Socorro || LINEAR || URS || align=right | 11 km || 
|-id=489 bgcolor=#d6d6d6
| 74489 ||  || — || February 11, 1999 || Socorro || LINEAR || ITH || align=right | 3.6 km || 
|-id=490 bgcolor=#d6d6d6
| 74490 ||  || — || February 11, 1999 || Socorro || LINEAR || TIR || align=right | 4.8 km || 
|-id=491 bgcolor=#E9E9E9
| 74491 ||  || — || February 11, 1999 || Socorro || LINEAR || HNS || align=right | 3.4 km || 
|-id=492 bgcolor=#d6d6d6
| 74492 ||  || — || February 11, 1999 || Socorro || LINEAR || — || align=right | 8.8 km || 
|-id=493 bgcolor=#d6d6d6
| 74493 ||  || — || February 11, 1999 || Socorro || LINEAR || ALA || align=right | 9.4 km || 
|-id=494 bgcolor=#E9E9E9
| 74494 ||  || — || February 11, 1999 || Socorro || LINEAR || — || align=right | 6.8 km || 
|-id=495 bgcolor=#d6d6d6
| 74495 ||  || — || February 11, 1999 || Socorro || LINEAR || — || align=right | 4.0 km || 
|-id=496 bgcolor=#d6d6d6
| 74496 ||  || — || February 9, 1999 || Kitt Peak || Spacewatch || — || align=right | 5.5 km || 
|-id=497 bgcolor=#d6d6d6
| 74497 ||  || — || February 9, 1999 || Kitt Peak || Spacewatch || — || align=right | 4.1 km || 
|-id=498 bgcolor=#E9E9E9
| 74498 ||  || — || February 7, 1999 || Kitt Peak || Spacewatch || — || align=right | 4.9 km || 
|-id=499 bgcolor=#d6d6d6
| 74499 ||  || — || February 10, 1999 || Kitt Peak || Spacewatch || — || align=right | 5.1 km || 
|-id=500 bgcolor=#d6d6d6
| 74500 ||  || — || February 9, 1999 || Kitt Peak || Spacewatch || — || align=right | 5.0 km || 
|}

74501–74600 

|-bgcolor=#d6d6d6
| 74501 ||  || — || February 12, 1999 || Kitt Peak || Spacewatch || — || align=right | 4.7 km || 
|-id=502 bgcolor=#E9E9E9
| 74502 ||  || — || February 19, 1999 || Oizumi || T. Kobayashi || EUN || align=right | 4.9 km || 
|-id=503 bgcolor=#d6d6d6
| 74503 Madola ||  ||  || February 23, 1999 || Val-des-Bois || D. Bergeron || — || align=right | 4.5 km || 
|-id=504 bgcolor=#E9E9E9
| 74504 ||  || — || February 18, 1999 || Anderson Mesa || LONEOS || — || align=right | 6.1 km || 
|-id=505 bgcolor=#d6d6d6
| 74505 || 1999 EQ || — || March 6, 1999 || Kitt Peak || Spacewatch || — || align=right | 4.5 km || 
|-id=506 bgcolor=#E9E9E9
| 74506 ||  || — || March 12, 1999 || Kitt Peak || Spacewatch || — || align=right | 7.4 km || 
|-id=507 bgcolor=#d6d6d6
| 74507 || 1999 FX || — || March 17, 1999 || Caussols || ODAS || HYG || align=right | 8.2 km || 
|-id=508 bgcolor=#d6d6d6
| 74508 ||  || — || March 16, 1999 || Kitt Peak || Spacewatch || — || align=right | 4.4 km || 
|-id=509 bgcolor=#d6d6d6
| 74509 Gillett ||  ||  || March 22, 1999 || Fountain Hills || C. W. Juels || THM || align=right | 4.6 km || 
|-id=510 bgcolor=#fefefe
| 74510 ||  || — || March 20, 1999 || Socorro || LINEAR || H || align=right | 1.6 km || 
|-id=511 bgcolor=#fefefe
| 74511 ||  || — || March 20, 1999 || Socorro || LINEAR || H || align=right | 1.6 km || 
|-id=512 bgcolor=#fefefe
| 74512 ||  || — || March 20, 1999 || Socorro || LINEAR || H || align=right | 1.4 km || 
|-id=513 bgcolor=#d6d6d6
| 74513 ||  || — || March 16, 1999 || Kitt Peak || Spacewatch || — || align=right | 4.5 km || 
|-id=514 bgcolor=#d6d6d6
| 74514 ||  || — || March 21, 1999 || Kitt Peak || Spacewatch || — || align=right | 5.0 km || 
|-id=515 bgcolor=#d6d6d6
| 74515 ||  || — || March 19, 1999 || Socorro || LINEAR || — || align=right | 6.9 km || 
|-id=516 bgcolor=#d6d6d6
| 74516 ||  || — || March 19, 1999 || Socorro || LINEAR || — || align=right | 5.1 km || 
|-id=517 bgcolor=#d6d6d6
| 74517 ||  || — || March 19, 1999 || Socorro || LINEAR || ALA || align=right | 12 km || 
|-id=518 bgcolor=#fefefe
| 74518 ||  || — || March 19, 1999 || Socorro || LINEAR || — || align=right | 2.1 km || 
|-id=519 bgcolor=#d6d6d6
| 74519 ||  || — || March 19, 1999 || Socorro || LINEAR || ALA || align=right | 12 km || 
|-id=520 bgcolor=#d6d6d6
| 74520 ||  || — || March 19, 1999 || Socorro || LINEAR || EOS || align=right | 5.1 km || 
|-id=521 bgcolor=#d6d6d6
| 74521 ||  || — || March 20, 1999 || Socorro || LINEAR || — || align=right | 6.9 km || 
|-id=522 bgcolor=#d6d6d6
| 74522 ||  || — || March 22, 1999 || Anderson Mesa || LONEOS || — || align=right | 6.6 km || 
|-id=523 bgcolor=#FA8072
| 74523 ||  || — || April 7, 1999 || Kitt Peak || Spacewatch || — || align=right | 1.3 km || 
|-id=524 bgcolor=#d6d6d6
| 74524 ||  || — || April 9, 1999 || Socorro || LINEAR || THM || align=right | 7.3 km || 
|-id=525 bgcolor=#d6d6d6
| 74525 ||  || — || April 6, 1999 || Socorro || LINEAR || MEL || align=right | 6.6 km || 
|-id=526 bgcolor=#d6d6d6
| 74526 ||  || — || April 6, 1999 || Socorro || LINEAR || — || align=right | 8.1 km || 
|-id=527 bgcolor=#d6d6d6
| 74527 ||  || — || April 6, 1999 || Socorro || LINEAR || EOS || align=right | 6.0 km || 
|-id=528 bgcolor=#d6d6d6
| 74528 ||  || — || April 6, 1999 || Socorro || LINEAR || — || align=right | 11 km || 
|-id=529 bgcolor=#d6d6d6
| 74529 ||  || — || April 6, 1999 || Socorro || LINEAR || — || align=right | 9.7 km || 
|-id=530 bgcolor=#d6d6d6
| 74530 ||  || — || April 12, 1999 || Socorro || LINEAR || — || align=right | 6.0 km || 
|-id=531 bgcolor=#d6d6d6
| 74531 ||  || — || April 12, 1999 || Socorro || LINEAR || — || align=right | 6.2 km || 
|-id=532 bgcolor=#E9E9E9
| 74532 ||  || — || April 6, 1999 || Anderson Mesa || LONEOS || — || align=right | 4.3 km || 
|-id=533 bgcolor=#d6d6d6
| 74533 ||  || — || April 10, 1999 || Anderson Mesa || LONEOS || EOS || align=right | 5.2 km || 
|-id=534 bgcolor=#d6d6d6
| 74534 || 1999 JA || — || May 1, 1999 || Woomera || F. B. Zoltowski || — || align=right | 7.3 km || 
|-id=535 bgcolor=#fefefe
| 74535 ||  || — || May 10, 1999 || Socorro || LINEAR || — || align=right | 1.4 km || 
|-id=536 bgcolor=#fefefe
| 74536 ||  || — || May 10, 1999 || Socorro || LINEAR || — || align=right | 1.5 km || 
|-id=537 bgcolor=#fefefe
| 74537 ||  || — || May 12, 1999 || Socorro || LINEAR || H || align=right | 1.5 km || 
|-id=538 bgcolor=#d6d6d6
| 74538 ||  || — || May 14, 1999 || Catalina || CSS || — || align=right | 10 km || 
|-id=539 bgcolor=#FA8072
| 74539 ||  || — || May 12, 1999 || Socorro || LINEAR || PHO || align=right | 2.2 km || 
|-id=540 bgcolor=#fefefe
| 74540 ||  || — || May 10, 1999 || Socorro || LINEAR || — || align=right | 1.3 km || 
|-id=541 bgcolor=#d6d6d6
| 74541 ||  || — || May 10, 1999 || Socorro || LINEAR || — || align=right | 9.0 km || 
|-id=542 bgcolor=#fefefe
| 74542 ||  || — || May 10, 1999 || Socorro || LINEAR || — || align=right | 1.2 km || 
|-id=543 bgcolor=#fefefe
| 74543 ||  || — || May 10, 1999 || Socorro || LINEAR || — || align=right | 1.8 km || 
|-id=544 bgcolor=#fefefe
| 74544 ||  || — || May 10, 1999 || Socorro || LINEAR || FLO || align=right | 1.5 km || 
|-id=545 bgcolor=#fefefe
| 74545 ||  || — || May 10, 1999 || Socorro || LINEAR || — || align=right | 2.0 km || 
|-id=546 bgcolor=#fefefe
| 74546 ||  || — || May 10, 1999 || Socorro || LINEAR || — || align=right | 2.7 km || 
|-id=547 bgcolor=#fefefe
| 74547 ||  || — || May 10, 1999 || Socorro || LINEAR || — || align=right | 2.1 km || 
|-id=548 bgcolor=#d6d6d6
| 74548 ||  || — || May 10, 1999 || Socorro || LINEAR || — || align=right | 9.5 km || 
|-id=549 bgcolor=#d6d6d6
| 74549 ||  || — || May 12, 1999 || Socorro || LINEAR || — || align=right | 4.6 km || 
|-id=550 bgcolor=#d6d6d6
| 74550 ||  || — || May 12, 1999 || Socorro || LINEAR || — || align=right | 6.5 km || 
|-id=551 bgcolor=#d6d6d6
| 74551 ||  || — || May 12, 1999 || Socorro || LINEAR || — || align=right | 7.6 km || 
|-id=552 bgcolor=#fefefe
| 74552 ||  || — || May 13, 1999 || Socorro || LINEAR || — || align=right | 1.5 km || 
|-id=553 bgcolor=#d6d6d6
| 74553 ||  || — || May 16, 1999 || Kitt Peak || Spacewatch || — || align=right | 10 km || 
|-id=554 bgcolor=#fefefe
| 74554 ||  || — || June 7, 1999 || Socorro || LINEAR || H || align=right | 1.2 km || 
|-id=555 bgcolor=#fefefe
| 74555 ||  || — || June 4, 1999 || Socorro || LINEAR || H || align=right | 2.9 km || 
|-id=556 bgcolor=#fefefe
| 74556 ||  || — || June 11, 1999 || Višnjan Observatory || K. Korlević || — || align=right | 2.0 km || 
|-id=557 bgcolor=#fefefe
| 74557 ||  || — || June 9, 1999 || Socorro || LINEAR || FLO || align=right | 1.7 km || 
|-id=558 bgcolor=#FA8072
| 74558 ||  || — || June 9, 1999 || Socorro || LINEAR || — || align=right | 2.0 km || 
|-id=559 bgcolor=#fefefe
| 74559 ||  || — || June 10, 1999 || Socorro || LINEAR || — || align=right | 1.3 km || 
|-id=560 bgcolor=#fefefe
| 74560 ||  || — || June 12, 1999 || Socorro || LINEAR || H || align=right | 1.1 km || 
|-id=561 bgcolor=#FA8072
| 74561 ||  || — || June 9, 1999 || Socorro || LINEAR || — || align=right | 2.2 km || 
|-id=562 bgcolor=#fefefe
| 74562 ||  || — || June 9, 1999 || Socorro || LINEAR || FLO || align=right | 1.7 km || 
|-id=563 bgcolor=#fefefe
| 74563 || 1999 MQ || — || June 20, 1999 || Reedy Creek || J. Broughton || FLO || align=right | 1.4 km || 
|-id=564 bgcolor=#FA8072
| 74564 ||  || — || July 12, 1999 || Socorro || LINEAR || — || align=right | 2.0 km || 
|-id=565 bgcolor=#fefefe
| 74565 ||  || — || July 13, 1999 || Socorro || LINEAR || V || align=right | 1.5 km || 
|-id=566 bgcolor=#fefefe
| 74566 ||  || — || July 10, 1999 || Mallorca || Á. López J., R. Pacheco || — || align=right | 2.2 km || 
|-id=567 bgcolor=#fefefe
| 74567 ||  || — || July 13, 1999 || Socorro || LINEAR || — || align=right | 1.3 km || 
|-id=568 bgcolor=#fefefe
| 74568 ||  || — || July 13, 1999 || Socorro || LINEAR || — || align=right | 2.3 km || 
|-id=569 bgcolor=#fefefe
| 74569 ||  || — || July 13, 1999 || Socorro || LINEAR || — || align=right | 2.2 km || 
|-id=570 bgcolor=#fefefe
| 74570 ||  || — || July 13, 1999 || Socorro || LINEAR || FLO || align=right | 2.0 km || 
|-id=571 bgcolor=#fefefe
| 74571 ||  || — || July 13, 1999 || Socorro || LINEAR || — || align=right | 2.3 km || 
|-id=572 bgcolor=#fefefe
| 74572 ||  || — || July 13, 1999 || Socorro || LINEAR || — || align=right | 1.6 km || 
|-id=573 bgcolor=#fefefe
| 74573 ||  || — || July 13, 1999 || Socorro || LINEAR || V || align=right | 1.5 km || 
|-id=574 bgcolor=#fefefe
| 74574 ||  || — || July 14, 1999 || Socorro || LINEAR || FLO || align=right | 1.3 km || 
|-id=575 bgcolor=#fefefe
| 74575 ||  || — || July 14, 1999 || Socorro || LINEAR || V || align=right | 1.5 km || 
|-id=576 bgcolor=#FA8072
| 74576 ||  || — || July 14, 1999 || Socorro || LINEAR || — || align=right | 1.6 km || 
|-id=577 bgcolor=#fefefe
| 74577 ||  || — || July 14, 1999 || Socorro || LINEAR || — || align=right | 2.1 km || 
|-id=578 bgcolor=#fefefe
| 74578 ||  || — || July 14, 1999 || Socorro || LINEAR || — || align=right | 2.9 km || 
|-id=579 bgcolor=#fefefe
| 74579 ||  || — || July 14, 1999 || Socorro || LINEAR || V || align=right | 1.4 km || 
|-id=580 bgcolor=#fefefe
| 74580 ||  || — || July 14, 1999 || Socorro || LINEAR || NYS || align=right | 1.4 km || 
|-id=581 bgcolor=#fefefe
| 74581 ||  || — || July 14, 1999 || Socorro || LINEAR || FLO || align=right | 1.1 km || 
|-id=582 bgcolor=#fefefe
| 74582 ||  || — || July 13, 1999 || Socorro || LINEAR || — || align=right | 1.8 km || 
|-id=583 bgcolor=#fefefe
| 74583 ||  || — || July 13, 1999 || Socorro || LINEAR || — || align=right | 2.0 km || 
|-id=584 bgcolor=#fefefe
| 74584 ||  || — || July 13, 1999 || Socorro || LINEAR || — || align=right | 1.5 km || 
|-id=585 bgcolor=#fefefe
| 74585 ||  || — || July 12, 1999 || Socorro || LINEAR || — || align=right | 2.0 km || 
|-id=586 bgcolor=#fefefe
| 74586 ||  || — || July 14, 1999 || Socorro || LINEAR || NYS || align=right | 1.4 km || 
|-id=587 bgcolor=#fefefe
| 74587 ||  || — || July 21, 1999 || Prescott || P. G. Comba || FLO || align=right | 1.3 km || 
|-id=588 bgcolor=#fefefe
| 74588 ||  || — || July 19, 1999 || Reedy Creek || J. Broughton || — || align=right | 1.7 km || 
|-id=589 bgcolor=#fefefe
| 74589 ||  || — || July 16, 1999 || Socorro || LINEAR || — || align=right | 1.8 km || 
|-id=590 bgcolor=#fefefe
| 74590 ||  || — || July 22, 1999 || Socorro || LINEAR || H || align=right | 3.3 km || 
|-id=591 bgcolor=#fefefe
| 74591 ||  || — || August 10, 1999 || Ametlla de Mar || J. Nomen || FLO || align=right | 2.0 km || 
|-id=592 bgcolor=#fefefe
| 74592 ||  || — || August 15, 1999 || Farpoint || G. Hug || — || align=right | 2.1 km || 
|-id=593 bgcolor=#fefefe
| 74593 ||  || — || August 15, 1999 || Farpoint || G. Hug || — || align=right | 1.7 km || 
|-id=594 bgcolor=#fefefe
| 74594 ||  || — || August 7, 1999 || Anderson Mesa || LONEOS || — || align=right | 1.8 km || 
|-id=595 bgcolor=#fefefe
| 74595 || 1999 QP || — || August 20, 1999 || Farpoint || G. Bell, G. Hug || MAS || align=right | 1.4 km || 
|-id=596 bgcolor=#fefefe
| 74596 || 1999 QQ || — || August 20, 1999 || Kleť || Kleť Obs. || EUT || align=right | 1.4 km || 
|-id=597 bgcolor=#fefefe
| 74597 || 1999 RG || — || September 3, 1999 || Prescott || P. G. Comba || — || align=right | 4.5 km || 
|-id=598 bgcolor=#fefefe
| 74598 ||  || — || September 5, 1999 || Višnjan Observatory || K. Korlević || EUT || align=right | 1.2 km || 
|-id=599 bgcolor=#fefefe
| 74599 ||  || — || September 6, 1999 || Višnjan Observatory || K. Korlević || — || align=right | 2.0 km || 
|-id=600 bgcolor=#fefefe
| 74600 ||  || — || September 2, 1999 || Bergisch Gladbach || W. Bickel || NYS || align=right | 1.3 km || 
|}

74601–74700 

|-bgcolor=#fefefe
| 74601 ||  || — || September 5, 1999 || Ondřejov || L. Kotková || — || align=right | 2.1 km || 
|-id=602 bgcolor=#fefefe
| 74602 ||  || — || September 5, 1999 || Catalina || CSS || — || align=right | 1.5 km || 
|-id=603 bgcolor=#E9E9E9
| 74603 ||  || — || September 3, 1999 || Kitt Peak || Spacewatch || — || align=right | 2.5 km || 
|-id=604 bgcolor=#fefefe
| 74604 ||  || — || September 7, 1999 || Socorro || LINEAR || — || align=right | 2.0 km || 
|-id=605 bgcolor=#fefefe
| 74605 ||  || — || September 7, 1999 || Socorro || LINEAR || NYS || align=right | 1.7 km || 
|-id=606 bgcolor=#fefefe
| 74606 ||  || — || September 7, 1999 || Socorro || LINEAR || — || align=right | 2.7 km || 
|-id=607 bgcolor=#E9E9E9
| 74607 ||  || — || September 7, 1999 || Socorro || LINEAR || — || align=right | 2.4 km || 
|-id=608 bgcolor=#fefefe
| 74608 ||  || — || September 7, 1999 || Socorro || LINEAR || — || align=right | 2.0 km || 
|-id=609 bgcolor=#fefefe
| 74609 ||  || — || September 7, 1999 || Socorro || LINEAR || FLO || align=right | 1.7 km || 
|-id=610 bgcolor=#fefefe
| 74610 ||  || — || September 7, 1999 || Socorro || LINEAR || KLI || align=right | 3.1 km || 
|-id=611 bgcolor=#fefefe
| 74611 ||  || — || September 7, 1999 || Socorro || LINEAR || — || align=right | 2.0 km || 
|-id=612 bgcolor=#fefefe
| 74612 ||  || — || September 7, 1999 || Socorro || LINEAR || — || align=right | 1.6 km || 
|-id=613 bgcolor=#fefefe
| 74613 ||  || — || September 7, 1999 || Socorro || LINEAR || NYS || align=right | 3.3 km || 
|-id=614 bgcolor=#fefefe
| 74614 ||  || — || September 7, 1999 || Socorro || LINEAR || MAS || align=right | 1.6 km || 
|-id=615 bgcolor=#fefefe
| 74615 ||  || — || September 7, 1999 || Socorro || LINEAR || MAS || align=right | 1.6 km || 
|-id=616 bgcolor=#fefefe
| 74616 ||  || — || September 7, 1999 || Socorro || LINEAR || — || align=right | 1.5 km || 
|-id=617 bgcolor=#fefefe
| 74617 ||  || — || September 7, 1999 || Socorro || LINEAR || — || align=right | 1.6 km || 
|-id=618 bgcolor=#fefefe
| 74618 ||  || — || September 7, 1999 || Socorro || LINEAR || — || align=right | 1.2 km || 
|-id=619 bgcolor=#fefefe
| 74619 ||  || — || September 7, 1999 || Socorro || LINEAR || — || align=right | 1.5 km || 
|-id=620 bgcolor=#fefefe
| 74620 ||  || — || September 8, 1999 || Črni Vrh || H. Mikuž || — || align=right | 1.7 km || 
|-id=621 bgcolor=#fefefe
| 74621 ||  || — || September 7, 1999 || Anderson Mesa || LONEOS || FLO || align=right | 1.3 km || 
|-id=622 bgcolor=#fefefe
| 74622 ||  || — || September 8, 1999 || Socorro || LINEAR || — || align=right | 1.9 km || 
|-id=623 bgcolor=#fefefe
| 74623 ||  || — || September 8, 1999 || Socorro || LINEAR || — || align=right | 3.1 km || 
|-id=624 bgcolor=#fefefe
| 74624 ||  || — || September 10, 1999 || Ametlla de Mar || J. Nomen || — || align=right | 1.7 km || 
|-id=625 bgcolor=#fefefe
| 74625 Tieproject ||  ||  || September 10, 1999 || Campo Catino || G. Masi, F. Mallia || — || align=right | 1.5 km || 
|-id=626 bgcolor=#fefefe
| 74626 ||  || — || September 12, 1999 || Reedy Creek || J. Broughton || — || align=right | 2.3 km || 
|-id=627 bgcolor=#fefefe
| 74627 ||  || — || September 14, 1999 || Višnjan Observatory || K. Korlević || — || align=right | 2.3 km || 
|-id=628 bgcolor=#fefefe
| 74628 ||  || — || September 12, 1999 || Črni Vrh || Črni Vrh || FLO || align=right | 2.0 km || 
|-id=629 bgcolor=#fefefe
| 74629 ||  || — || September 11, 1999 || Saint-Michel-sur-Meurthe || L. Bernasconi || NYS || align=right | 1.5 km || 
|-id=630 bgcolor=#fefefe
| 74630 ||  || — || September 7, 1999 || Socorro || LINEAR || — || align=right | 2.1 km || 
|-id=631 bgcolor=#fefefe
| 74631 ||  || — || September 7, 1999 || Socorro || LINEAR || — || align=right | 1.4 km || 
|-id=632 bgcolor=#fefefe
| 74632 ||  || — || September 7, 1999 || Socorro || LINEAR || — || align=right | 1.8 km || 
|-id=633 bgcolor=#fefefe
| 74633 ||  || — || September 7, 1999 || Socorro || LINEAR || — || align=right | 2.3 km || 
|-id=634 bgcolor=#fefefe
| 74634 ||  || — || September 7, 1999 || Socorro || LINEAR || — || align=right | 1.5 km || 
|-id=635 bgcolor=#fefefe
| 74635 ||  || — || September 7, 1999 || Socorro || LINEAR || — || align=right | 1.5 km || 
|-id=636 bgcolor=#fefefe
| 74636 ||  || — || September 7, 1999 || Socorro || LINEAR || NYS || align=right | 1.6 km || 
|-id=637 bgcolor=#fefefe
| 74637 ||  || — || September 7, 1999 || Socorro || LINEAR || FLO || align=right | 1.8 km || 
|-id=638 bgcolor=#fefefe
| 74638 ||  || — || September 7, 1999 || Socorro || LINEAR || MAS || align=right | 1.4 km || 
|-id=639 bgcolor=#fefefe
| 74639 ||  || — || September 7, 1999 || Socorro || LINEAR || V || align=right | 1.4 km || 
|-id=640 bgcolor=#fefefe
| 74640 ||  || — || September 7, 1999 || Socorro || LINEAR || — || align=right | 2.2 km || 
|-id=641 bgcolor=#fefefe
| 74641 ||  || — || September 7, 1999 || Socorro || LINEAR || FLO || align=right | 1.8 km || 
|-id=642 bgcolor=#fefefe
| 74642 ||  || — || September 7, 1999 || Socorro || LINEAR || — || align=right | 1.6 km || 
|-id=643 bgcolor=#fefefe
| 74643 ||  || — || September 7, 1999 || Socorro || LINEAR || NYS || align=right | 1.6 km || 
|-id=644 bgcolor=#FA8072
| 74644 ||  || — || September 7, 1999 || Socorro || LINEAR || — || align=right | 1.7 km || 
|-id=645 bgcolor=#fefefe
| 74645 ||  || — || September 7, 1999 || Socorro || LINEAR || NYS || align=right | 1.2 km || 
|-id=646 bgcolor=#fefefe
| 74646 ||  || — || September 7, 1999 || Socorro || LINEAR || NYS || align=right | 1.1 km || 
|-id=647 bgcolor=#fefefe
| 74647 ||  || — || September 7, 1999 || Socorro || LINEAR || MAS || align=right | 1.5 km || 
|-id=648 bgcolor=#fefefe
| 74648 ||  || — || September 7, 1999 || Socorro || LINEAR || — || align=right | 1.6 km || 
|-id=649 bgcolor=#fefefe
| 74649 ||  || — || September 7, 1999 || Socorro || LINEAR || fast? || align=right | 1.5 km || 
|-id=650 bgcolor=#fefefe
| 74650 ||  || — || September 7, 1999 || Socorro || LINEAR || V || align=right | 1.2 km || 
|-id=651 bgcolor=#E9E9E9
| 74651 ||  || — || September 7, 1999 || Socorro || LINEAR || — || align=right | 1.7 km || 
|-id=652 bgcolor=#fefefe
| 74652 ||  || — || September 7, 1999 || Socorro || LINEAR || MAS || align=right | 1.3 km || 
|-id=653 bgcolor=#fefefe
| 74653 ||  || — || September 7, 1999 || Socorro || LINEAR || NYS || align=right | 1.6 km || 
|-id=654 bgcolor=#fefefe
| 74654 ||  || — || September 7, 1999 || Socorro || LINEAR || — || align=right | 2.0 km || 
|-id=655 bgcolor=#fefefe
| 74655 ||  || — || September 7, 1999 || Socorro || LINEAR || NYS || align=right | 1.4 km || 
|-id=656 bgcolor=#fefefe
| 74656 ||  || — || September 7, 1999 || Socorro || LINEAR || — || align=right | 2.8 km || 
|-id=657 bgcolor=#fefefe
| 74657 ||  || — || September 7, 1999 || Socorro || LINEAR || — || align=right | 1.7 km || 
|-id=658 bgcolor=#fefefe
| 74658 ||  || — || September 7, 1999 || Socorro || LINEAR || NYS || align=right | 1.3 km || 
|-id=659 bgcolor=#fefefe
| 74659 ||  || — || September 7, 1999 || Socorro || LINEAR || — || align=right | 1.7 km || 
|-id=660 bgcolor=#E9E9E9
| 74660 ||  || — || September 7, 1999 || Socorro || LINEAR || — || align=right | 6.2 km || 
|-id=661 bgcolor=#fefefe
| 74661 ||  || — || September 7, 1999 || Socorro || LINEAR || — || align=right | 1.8 km || 
|-id=662 bgcolor=#E9E9E9
| 74662 ||  || — || September 7, 1999 || Socorro || LINEAR || — || align=right | 2.1 km || 
|-id=663 bgcolor=#fefefe
| 74663 ||  || — || September 7, 1999 || Socorro || LINEAR || FLO || align=right | 1.5 km || 
|-id=664 bgcolor=#fefefe
| 74664 ||  || — || September 7, 1999 || Socorro || LINEAR || V || align=right | 1.3 km || 
|-id=665 bgcolor=#fefefe
| 74665 ||  || — || September 7, 1999 || Socorro || LINEAR || — || align=right | 2.1 km || 
|-id=666 bgcolor=#fefefe
| 74666 ||  || — || September 7, 1999 || Socorro || LINEAR || FLO || align=right | 1.7 km || 
|-id=667 bgcolor=#fefefe
| 74667 ||  || — || September 7, 1999 || Socorro || LINEAR || NYS || align=right | 1.9 km || 
|-id=668 bgcolor=#fefefe
| 74668 ||  || — || September 7, 1999 || Socorro || LINEAR || MAS || align=right | 1.4 km || 
|-id=669 bgcolor=#fefefe
| 74669 ||  || — || September 7, 1999 || Socorro || LINEAR || MAS || align=right | 1.5 km || 
|-id=670 bgcolor=#fefefe
| 74670 ||  || — || September 8, 1999 || Socorro || LINEAR || — || align=right | 1.7 km || 
|-id=671 bgcolor=#fefefe
| 74671 ||  || — || September 8, 1999 || Socorro || LINEAR || V || align=right | 1.2 km || 
|-id=672 bgcolor=#fefefe
| 74672 ||  || — || September 8, 1999 || Socorro || LINEAR || — || align=right | 1.9 km || 
|-id=673 bgcolor=#fefefe
| 74673 ||  || — || September 8, 1999 || Socorro || LINEAR || EUT || align=right | 1.5 km || 
|-id=674 bgcolor=#fefefe
| 74674 ||  || — || September 8, 1999 || Socorro || LINEAR || V || align=right | 2.0 km || 
|-id=675 bgcolor=#fefefe
| 74675 ||  || — || September 8, 1999 || Socorro || LINEAR || V || align=right | 1.5 km || 
|-id=676 bgcolor=#fefefe
| 74676 ||  || — || September 8, 1999 || Socorro || LINEAR || V || align=right | 1.4 km || 
|-id=677 bgcolor=#fefefe
| 74677 ||  || — || September 9, 1999 || Socorro || LINEAR || FLO || align=right | 1.7 km || 
|-id=678 bgcolor=#fefefe
| 74678 ||  || — || September 9, 1999 || Socorro || LINEAR || — || align=right | 2.1 km || 
|-id=679 bgcolor=#fefefe
| 74679 ||  || — || September 9, 1999 || Socorro || LINEAR || — || align=right | 2.2 km || 
|-id=680 bgcolor=#fefefe
| 74680 ||  || — || September 9, 1999 || Socorro || LINEAR || — || align=right | 2.0 km || 
|-id=681 bgcolor=#fefefe
| 74681 ||  || — || September 9, 1999 || Socorro || LINEAR || — || align=right | 3.3 km || 
|-id=682 bgcolor=#fefefe
| 74682 ||  || — || September 9, 1999 || Socorro || LINEAR || V || align=right | 1.2 km || 
|-id=683 bgcolor=#fefefe
| 74683 ||  || — || September 9, 1999 || Socorro || LINEAR || V || align=right | 1.4 km || 
|-id=684 bgcolor=#fefefe
| 74684 ||  || — || September 9, 1999 || Socorro || LINEAR || V || align=right | 2.1 km || 
|-id=685 bgcolor=#fefefe
| 74685 ||  || — || September 9, 1999 || Socorro || LINEAR || — || align=right | 2.2 km || 
|-id=686 bgcolor=#fefefe
| 74686 ||  || — || September 9, 1999 || Socorro || LINEAR || NYS || align=right | 1.8 km || 
|-id=687 bgcolor=#fefefe
| 74687 ||  || — || September 9, 1999 || Socorro || LINEAR || FLO || align=right | 1.7 km || 
|-id=688 bgcolor=#fefefe
| 74688 ||  || — || September 9, 1999 || Socorro || LINEAR || — || align=right | 2.1 km || 
|-id=689 bgcolor=#fefefe
| 74689 ||  || — || September 9, 1999 || Socorro || LINEAR || — || align=right | 1.6 km || 
|-id=690 bgcolor=#fefefe
| 74690 ||  || — || September 9, 1999 || Socorro || LINEAR || — || align=right | 1.8 km || 
|-id=691 bgcolor=#fefefe
| 74691 ||  || — || September 9, 1999 || Socorro || LINEAR || V || align=right | 1.5 km || 
|-id=692 bgcolor=#fefefe
| 74692 ||  || — || September 9, 1999 || Socorro || LINEAR || V || align=right | 1.6 km || 
|-id=693 bgcolor=#fefefe
| 74693 ||  || — || September 9, 1999 || Socorro || LINEAR || — || align=right | 1.7 km || 
|-id=694 bgcolor=#E9E9E9
| 74694 ||  || — || September 9, 1999 || Socorro || LINEAR || RAF || align=right | 2.0 km || 
|-id=695 bgcolor=#fefefe
| 74695 ||  || — || September 9, 1999 || Socorro || LINEAR || — || align=right | 1.6 km || 
|-id=696 bgcolor=#fefefe
| 74696 ||  || — || September 9, 1999 || Socorro || LINEAR || — || align=right | 1.4 km || 
|-id=697 bgcolor=#fefefe
| 74697 ||  || — || September 9, 1999 || Socorro || LINEAR || — || align=right | 2.4 km || 
|-id=698 bgcolor=#fefefe
| 74698 ||  || — || September 9, 1999 || Socorro || LINEAR || FLO || align=right | 1.7 km || 
|-id=699 bgcolor=#fefefe
| 74699 ||  || — || September 9, 1999 || Socorro || LINEAR || V || align=right | 1.3 km || 
|-id=700 bgcolor=#fefefe
| 74700 ||  || — || September 9, 1999 || Socorro || LINEAR || — || align=right | 2.4 km || 
|}

74701–74800 

|-bgcolor=#fefefe
| 74701 ||  || — || September 9, 1999 || Socorro || LINEAR || — || align=right | 1.8 km || 
|-id=702 bgcolor=#fefefe
| 74702 ||  || — || September 9, 1999 || Socorro || LINEAR || FLO || align=right | 1.8 km || 
|-id=703 bgcolor=#fefefe
| 74703 ||  || — || September 9, 1999 || Socorro || LINEAR || NYS || align=right | 3.3 km || 
|-id=704 bgcolor=#fefefe
| 74704 ||  || — || September 9, 1999 || Socorro || LINEAR || — || align=right | 1.7 km || 
|-id=705 bgcolor=#fefefe
| 74705 ||  || — || September 9, 1999 || Socorro || LINEAR || — || align=right | 3.1 km || 
|-id=706 bgcolor=#fefefe
| 74706 ||  || — || September 9, 1999 || Socorro || LINEAR || FLO || align=right | 1.5 km || 
|-id=707 bgcolor=#fefefe
| 74707 ||  || — || September 9, 1999 || Socorro || LINEAR || — || align=right | 1.7 km || 
|-id=708 bgcolor=#fefefe
| 74708 ||  || — || September 9, 1999 || Socorro || LINEAR || FLO || align=right | 1.6 km || 
|-id=709 bgcolor=#fefefe
| 74709 ||  || — || September 9, 1999 || Socorro || LINEAR || — || align=right | 1.6 km || 
|-id=710 bgcolor=#fefefe
| 74710 ||  || — || September 9, 1999 || Socorro || LINEAR || FLO || align=right | 1.7 km || 
|-id=711 bgcolor=#fefefe
| 74711 ||  || — || September 9, 1999 || Socorro || LINEAR || FLO || align=right | 1.8 km || 
|-id=712 bgcolor=#fefefe
| 74712 ||  || — || September 9, 1999 || Socorro || LINEAR || — || align=right | 1.9 km || 
|-id=713 bgcolor=#fefefe
| 74713 ||  || — || September 9, 1999 || Socorro || LINEAR || — || align=right | 1.6 km || 
|-id=714 bgcolor=#fefefe
| 74714 ||  || — || September 9, 1999 || Socorro || LINEAR || V || align=right | 1.3 km || 
|-id=715 bgcolor=#fefefe
| 74715 ||  || — || September 9, 1999 || Socorro || LINEAR || — || align=right | 2.4 km || 
|-id=716 bgcolor=#fefefe
| 74716 ||  || — || September 9, 1999 || Socorro || LINEAR || — || align=right | 2.4 km || 
|-id=717 bgcolor=#fefefe
| 74717 ||  || — || September 9, 1999 || Socorro || LINEAR || FLO || align=right | 1.6 km || 
|-id=718 bgcolor=#fefefe
| 74718 ||  || — || September 9, 1999 || Socorro || LINEAR || — || align=right | 2.0 km || 
|-id=719 bgcolor=#fefefe
| 74719 ||  || — || September 9, 1999 || Socorro || LINEAR || FLO || align=right | 1.9 km || 
|-id=720 bgcolor=#fefefe
| 74720 ||  || — || September 9, 1999 || Socorro || LINEAR || — || align=right | 1.8 km || 
|-id=721 bgcolor=#FA8072
| 74721 ||  || — || September 9, 1999 || Socorro || LINEAR || — || align=right | 1.6 km || 
|-id=722 bgcolor=#fefefe
| 74722 ||  || — || September 9, 1999 || Socorro || LINEAR || — || align=right | 2.2 km || 
|-id=723 bgcolor=#fefefe
| 74723 ||  || — || September 9, 1999 || Socorro || LINEAR || — || align=right | 2.7 km || 
|-id=724 bgcolor=#fefefe
| 74724 ||  || — || September 9, 1999 || Socorro || LINEAR || — || align=right | 1.3 km || 
|-id=725 bgcolor=#fefefe
| 74725 ||  || — || September 9, 1999 || Socorro || LINEAR || — || align=right | 1.8 km || 
|-id=726 bgcolor=#fefefe
| 74726 ||  || — || September 9, 1999 || Socorro || LINEAR || NYS || align=right | 1.1 km || 
|-id=727 bgcolor=#fefefe
| 74727 ||  || — || September 9, 1999 || Socorro || LINEAR || NYS || align=right | 3.1 km || 
|-id=728 bgcolor=#fefefe
| 74728 ||  || — || September 9, 1999 || Socorro || LINEAR || — || align=right | 2.3 km || 
|-id=729 bgcolor=#fefefe
| 74729 ||  || — || September 9, 1999 || Socorro || LINEAR || — || align=right | 2.4 km || 
|-id=730 bgcolor=#fefefe
| 74730 ||  || — || September 9, 1999 || Socorro || LINEAR || NYS || align=right | 4.1 km || 
|-id=731 bgcolor=#fefefe
| 74731 ||  || — || September 9, 1999 || Socorro || LINEAR || — || align=right | 2.0 km || 
|-id=732 bgcolor=#fefefe
| 74732 ||  || — || September 9, 1999 || Socorro || LINEAR || FLO || align=right | 1.8 km || 
|-id=733 bgcolor=#fefefe
| 74733 ||  || — || September 9, 1999 || Socorro || LINEAR || NYS || align=right | 1.3 km || 
|-id=734 bgcolor=#fefefe
| 74734 ||  || — || September 9, 1999 || Socorro || LINEAR || V || align=right | 2.3 km || 
|-id=735 bgcolor=#fefefe
| 74735 ||  || — || September 9, 1999 || Socorro || LINEAR || FLO || align=right | 1.7 km || 
|-id=736 bgcolor=#fefefe
| 74736 ||  || — || September 9, 1999 || Socorro || LINEAR || V || align=right | 1.6 km || 
|-id=737 bgcolor=#fefefe
| 74737 ||  || — || September 9, 1999 || Socorro || LINEAR || FLO || align=right | 1.8 km || 
|-id=738 bgcolor=#fefefe
| 74738 ||  || — || September 9, 1999 || Socorro || LINEAR || — || align=right | 1.8 km || 
|-id=739 bgcolor=#fefefe
| 74739 ||  || — || September 9, 1999 || Socorro || LINEAR || NYS || align=right | 1.5 km || 
|-id=740 bgcolor=#fefefe
| 74740 ||  || — || September 9, 1999 || Socorro || LINEAR || — || align=right | 2.6 km || 
|-id=741 bgcolor=#fefefe
| 74741 ||  || — || September 9, 1999 || Socorro || LINEAR || NYS || align=right | 2.8 km || 
|-id=742 bgcolor=#fefefe
| 74742 ||  || — || September 9, 1999 || Socorro || LINEAR || — || align=right | 2.0 km || 
|-id=743 bgcolor=#fefefe
| 74743 ||  || — || September 9, 1999 || Socorro || LINEAR || NYS || align=right | 1.5 km || 
|-id=744 bgcolor=#fefefe
| 74744 ||  || — || September 9, 1999 || Socorro || LINEAR || — || align=right | 1.4 km || 
|-id=745 bgcolor=#fefefe
| 74745 ||  || — || September 11, 1999 || Socorro || LINEAR || CHL || align=right | 5.1 km || 
|-id=746 bgcolor=#fefefe
| 74746 ||  || — || September 15, 1999 || Kitt Peak || Spacewatch || — || align=right | 2.2 km || 
|-id=747 bgcolor=#fefefe
| 74747 ||  || — || September 13, 1999 || Socorro || LINEAR || FLO || align=right | 1.7 km || 
|-id=748 bgcolor=#fefefe
| 74748 ||  || — || September 7, 1999 || Socorro || LINEAR || — || align=right | 2.4 km || 
|-id=749 bgcolor=#fefefe
| 74749 ||  || — || September 8, 1999 || Socorro || LINEAR || PHO || align=right | 5.6 km || 
|-id=750 bgcolor=#fefefe
| 74750 ||  || — || September 8, 1999 || Socorro || LINEAR || — || align=right | 2.6 km || 
|-id=751 bgcolor=#fefefe
| 74751 ||  || — || September 8, 1999 || Socorro || LINEAR || FLO || align=right | 1.8 km || 
|-id=752 bgcolor=#E9E9E9
| 74752 ||  || — || September 8, 1999 || Socorro || LINEAR || EUN || align=right | 2.5 km || 
|-id=753 bgcolor=#fefefe
| 74753 ||  || — || September 8, 1999 || Socorro || LINEAR || — || align=right | 2.3 km || 
|-id=754 bgcolor=#fefefe
| 74754 ||  || — || September 9, 1999 || Socorro || LINEAR || — || align=right | 1.7 km || 
|-id=755 bgcolor=#fefefe
| 74755 ||  || — || September 8, 1999 || Socorro || LINEAR || ERI || align=right | 3.9 km || 
|-id=756 bgcolor=#fefefe
| 74756 ||  || — || September 8, 1999 || Socorro || LINEAR || FLO || align=right | 1.8 km || 
|-id=757 bgcolor=#fefefe
| 74757 ||  || — || September 8, 1999 || Socorro || LINEAR || V || align=right | 2.0 km || 
|-id=758 bgcolor=#fefefe
| 74758 ||  || — || September 8, 1999 || Socorro || LINEAR || — || align=right | 1.9 km || 
|-id=759 bgcolor=#fefefe
| 74759 ||  || — || September 8, 1999 || Socorro || LINEAR || FLO || align=right | 1.7 km || 
|-id=760 bgcolor=#fefefe
| 74760 ||  || — || September 8, 1999 || Socorro || LINEAR || V || align=right | 1.5 km || 
|-id=761 bgcolor=#fefefe
| 74761 ||  || — || September 8, 1999 || Socorro || LINEAR || V || align=right | 1.9 km || 
|-id=762 bgcolor=#fefefe
| 74762 ||  || — || September 8, 1999 || Socorro || LINEAR || — || align=right | 1.9 km || 
|-id=763 bgcolor=#fefefe
| 74763 ||  || — || September 8, 1999 || Socorro || LINEAR || — || align=right | 2.8 km || 
|-id=764 bgcolor=#fefefe
| 74764 Rudolfpešek ||  ||  || September 15, 1999 || Ondřejov || P. Kušnirák, P. Pravec || — || align=right | 2.0 km || 
|-id=765 bgcolor=#fefefe
| 74765 ||  || — || September 4, 1999 || Anderson Mesa || LONEOS || NYS || align=right | 1.4 km || 
|-id=766 bgcolor=#fefefe
| 74766 ||  || — || September 4, 1999 || Anderson Mesa || LONEOS || — || align=right | 2.0 km || 
|-id=767 bgcolor=#fefefe
| 74767 ||  || — || September 5, 1999 || Anderson Mesa || LONEOS || — || align=right | 1.6 km || 
|-id=768 bgcolor=#fefefe
| 74768 ||  || — || September 7, 1999 || Anderson Mesa || LONEOS || — || align=right | 1.6 km || 
|-id=769 bgcolor=#fefefe
| 74769 ||  || — || September 7, 1999 || Anderson Mesa || LONEOS || — || align=right | 1.4 km || 
|-id=770 bgcolor=#fefefe
| 74770 ||  || — || September 7, 1999 || Catalina || CSS || — || align=right | 1.7 km || 
|-id=771 bgcolor=#fefefe
| 74771 ||  || — || September 7, 1999 || Socorro || LINEAR || FLO || align=right | 1.1 km || 
|-id=772 bgcolor=#fefefe
| 74772 ||  || — || September 8, 1999 || Catalina || CSS || — || align=right | 3.5 km || 
|-id=773 bgcolor=#fefefe
| 74773 ||  || — || September 8, 1999 || Catalina || CSS || — || align=right | 1.5 km || 
|-id=774 bgcolor=#fefefe
| 74774 ||  || — || September 8, 1999 || Catalina || CSS || V || align=right | 1.4 km || 
|-id=775 bgcolor=#fefefe
| 74775 ||  || — || September 8, 1999 || Catalina || CSS || — || align=right | 1.8 km || 
|-id=776 bgcolor=#fefefe
| 74776 ||  || — || September 8, 1999 || Catalina || CSS || FLO || align=right | 1.5 km || 
|-id=777 bgcolor=#fefefe
| 74777 ||  || — || September 8, 1999 || Socorro || LINEAR || — || align=right | 2.5 km || 
|-id=778 bgcolor=#fefefe
| 74778 ||  || — || September 8, 1999 || Anderson Mesa || LONEOS || FLO || align=right | 1.9 km || 
|-id=779 bgcolor=#FA8072
| 74779 ||  || — || September 11, 1999 || Socorro || LINEAR || PHO || align=right | 2.8 km || 
|-id=780 bgcolor=#fefefe
| 74780 ||  || — || September 14, 1999 || Catalina || CSS || NYS || align=right | 1.5 km || 
|-id=781 bgcolor=#fefefe
| 74781 ||  || — || September 7, 1999 || Anderson Mesa || LONEOS || — || align=right | 2.1 km || 
|-id=782 bgcolor=#fefefe
| 74782 ||  || — || September 7, 1999 || Anderson Mesa || LONEOS || — || align=right | 2.7 km || 
|-id=783 bgcolor=#fefefe
| 74783 ||  || — || September 7, 1999 || Kitt Peak || Spacewatch || V || align=right | 1.2 km || 
|-id=784 bgcolor=#fefefe
| 74784 ||  || — || September 7, 1999 || Socorro || LINEAR || — || align=right | 2.5 km || 
|-id=785 bgcolor=#fefefe
| 74785 ||  || — || September 6, 1999 || Catalina || CSS || V || align=right | 1.7 km || 
|-id=786 bgcolor=#fefefe
| 74786 || 1999 SY || — || September 16, 1999 || Kitt Peak || Spacewatch || NYS || align=right | 1.6 km || 
|-id=787 bgcolor=#fefefe
| 74787 ||  || — || September 22, 1999 || Višnjan Observatory || K. Korlević || NYS || align=right | 1.8 km || 
|-id=788 bgcolor=#fefefe
| 74788 ||  || — || September 22, 1999 || Socorro || LINEAR || PHO || align=right | 2.6 km || 
|-id=789 bgcolor=#FA8072
| 74789 ||  || — || September 30, 1999 || Socorro || LINEAR || — || align=right | 3.9 km || 
|-id=790 bgcolor=#fefefe
| 74790 ||  || — || September 30, 1999 || Socorro || LINEAR || — || align=right | 2.0 km || 
|-id=791 bgcolor=#fefefe
| 74791 ||  || — || September 30, 1999 || Zeno || T. Stafford || NYS || align=right | 1.7 km || 
|-id=792 bgcolor=#E9E9E9
| 74792 ||  || — || September 29, 1999 || Višnjan Observatory || K. Korlević || — || align=right | 2.7 km || 
|-id=793 bgcolor=#fefefe
| 74793 ||  || — || September 29, 1999 || Xinglong || SCAP || V || align=right | 1.7 km || 
|-id=794 bgcolor=#fefefe
| 74794 ||  || — || September 22, 1999 || Socorro || LINEAR || PHO || align=right | 2.6 km || 
|-id=795 bgcolor=#fefefe
| 74795 ||  || — || September 29, 1999 || Catalina || CSS || — || align=right | 1.7 km || 
|-id=796 bgcolor=#fefefe
| 74796 ||  || — || September 29, 1999 || Catalina || CSS || FLO || align=right | 1.5 km || 
|-id=797 bgcolor=#fefefe
| 74797 ||  || — || September 30, 1999 || Catalina || CSS || — || align=right | 2.3 km || 
|-id=798 bgcolor=#fefefe
| 74798 ||  || — || September 30, 1999 || Catalina || CSS || — || align=right | 2.4 km || 
|-id=799 bgcolor=#fefefe
| 74799 ||  || — || September 30, 1999 || Socorro || LINEAR || FLO || align=right | 1.3 km || 
|-id=800 bgcolor=#fefefe
| 74800 ||  || — || September 30, 1999 || Socorro || LINEAR || FLO || align=right | 1.4 km || 
|}

74801–74900 

|-bgcolor=#fefefe
| 74801 ||  || — || September 30, 1999 || Socorro || LINEAR || FLO || align=right | 2.1 km || 
|-id=802 bgcolor=#fefefe
| 74802 ||  || — || September 30, 1999 || Socorro || LINEAR || FLO || align=right | 1.7 km || 
|-id=803 bgcolor=#fefefe
| 74803 ||  || — || September 21, 1999 || Anderson Mesa || LONEOS || — || align=right | 2.3 km || 
|-id=804 bgcolor=#fefefe
| 74804 ||  || — || September 30, 1999 || Kitt Peak || Spacewatch || V || align=right | 1.3 km || 
|-id=805 bgcolor=#fefefe
| 74805 || 1999 TF || — || October 2, 1999 || Kleť || Kleť Obs. || — || align=right | 1.8 km || 
|-id=806 bgcolor=#fefefe
| 74806 || 1999 TT || — || October 1, 1999 || Višnjan Observatory || K. Korlević || V || align=right | 1.8 km || 
|-id=807 bgcolor=#fefefe
| 74807 || 1999 TV || — || October 1, 1999 || Višnjan Observatory || K. Korlević || — || align=right | 1.8 km || 
|-id=808 bgcolor=#fefefe
| 74808 ||  || — || October 1, 1999 || Višnjan Observatory || K. Korlević || — || align=right | 2.7 km || 
|-id=809 bgcolor=#fefefe
| 74809 ||  || — || October 2, 1999 || Fountain Hills || C. W. Juels || FLO || align=right | 1.7 km || 
|-id=810 bgcolor=#fefefe
| 74810 ||  || — || October 4, 1999 || Socorro || LINEAR || PHO || align=right | 2.6 km || 
|-id=811 bgcolor=#E9E9E9
| 74811 ||  || — || October 1, 1999 || Farpoint || G. Hug || — || align=right | 3.7 km || 
|-id=812 bgcolor=#fefefe
| 74812 ||  || — || October 1, 1999 || Višnjan Observatory || K. Korlević, M. Jurić || — || align=right | 2.1 km || 
|-id=813 bgcolor=#fefefe
| 74813 ||  || — || October 6, 1999 || Višnjan Observatory || K. Korlević, M. Jurić || — || align=right | 3.6 km || 
|-id=814 bgcolor=#fefefe
| 74814 ||  || — || October 5, 1999 || Fountain Hills || C. W. Juels || EUT || align=right | 1.7 km || 
|-id=815 bgcolor=#fefefe
| 74815 ||  || — || October 7, 1999 || Fountain Hills || C. W. Juels || FLO || align=right | 2.6 km || 
|-id=816 bgcolor=#fefefe
| 74816 ||  || — || October 1, 1999 || Farra d'Isonzo || Farra d'Isonzo || NYS || align=right | 1.2 km || 
|-id=817 bgcolor=#fefefe
| 74817 ||  || — || October 6, 1999 || Farra d'Isonzo || Farra d'Isonzo || FLO || align=right | 1.4 km || 
|-id=818 bgcolor=#fefefe
| 74818 Iten ||  ||  || October 7, 1999 || Gnosca || S. Sposetti || — || align=right | 2.3 km || 
|-id=819 bgcolor=#E9E9E9
| 74819 ||  || — || October 9, 1999 || Fountain Hills || C. W. Juels || — || align=right | 5.9 km || 
|-id=820 bgcolor=#fefefe
| 74820 ||  || — || October 7, 1999 || Siding Spring || R. H. McNaught || PHO || align=right | 3.2 km || 
|-id=821 bgcolor=#fefefe
| 74821 ||  || — || October 10, 1999 || Črni Vrh || Črni Vrh || — || align=right | 2.0 km || 
|-id=822 bgcolor=#fefefe
| 74822 ||  || — || October 12, 1999 || Fountain Hills || C. W. Juels || V || align=right | 1.7 km || 
|-id=823 bgcolor=#FA8072
| 74823 ||  || — || October 10, 1999 || Gekko || T. Kagawa || PHO || align=right | 2.4 km || 
|-id=824 bgcolor=#fefefe
| 74824 Tarter ||  ||  || October 12, 1999 || Fountain Hills || C. W. Juels || NYS || align=right | 4.1 km || 
|-id=825 bgcolor=#fefefe
| 74825 ||  || — || October 15, 1999 || Višnjan Observatory || K. Korlević || V || align=right | 1.4 km || 
|-id=826 bgcolor=#fefefe
| 74826 ||  || — || October 13, 1999 || Modra || A. Galád, P. Kolény || — || align=right | 2.1 km || 
|-id=827 bgcolor=#fefefe
| 74827 ||  || — || October 4, 1999 || Xinglong || SCAP || NYS || align=right | 1.5 km || 
|-id=828 bgcolor=#fefefe
| 74828 ||  || — || October 7, 1999 || Goodricke-Pigott || R. A. Tucker || — || align=right | 1.9 km || 
|-id=829 bgcolor=#fefefe
| 74829 ||  || — || October 2, 1999 || Kitt Peak || Spacewatch || V || align=right | 1.2 km || 
|-id=830 bgcolor=#fefefe
| 74830 ||  || — || October 3, 1999 || Kitt Peak || Spacewatch || NYS || align=right | 1.5 km || 
|-id=831 bgcolor=#fefefe
| 74831 ||  || — || October 3, 1999 || Socorro || LINEAR || MAS || align=right | 1.2 km || 
|-id=832 bgcolor=#fefefe
| 74832 ||  || — || October 3, 1999 || Socorro || LINEAR || CHL || align=right | 5.1 km || 
|-id=833 bgcolor=#fefefe
| 74833 ||  || — || October 3, 1999 || Socorro || LINEAR || — || align=right | 2.2 km || 
|-id=834 bgcolor=#E9E9E9
| 74834 ||  || — || October 4, 1999 || Socorro || LINEAR || — || align=right | 1.8 km || 
|-id=835 bgcolor=#fefefe
| 74835 ||  || — || October 4, 1999 || Socorro || LINEAR || — || align=right | 2.1 km || 
|-id=836 bgcolor=#fefefe
| 74836 ||  || — || October 4, 1999 || Socorro || LINEAR || — || align=right | 1.8 km || 
|-id=837 bgcolor=#fefefe
| 74837 ||  || — || October 4, 1999 || Socorro || LINEAR || NYS || align=right | 3.3 km || 
|-id=838 bgcolor=#fefefe
| 74838 ||  || — || October 3, 1999 || Catalina || CSS || FLO || align=right | 2.6 km || 
|-id=839 bgcolor=#FA8072
| 74839 ||  || — || October 3, 1999 || Socorro || LINEAR || — || align=right | 2.4 km || 
|-id=840 bgcolor=#fefefe
| 74840 ||  || — || October 6, 1999 || Socorro || LINEAR || — || align=right | 1.9 km || 
|-id=841 bgcolor=#fefefe
| 74841 ||  || — || October 11, 1999 || Anderson Mesa || LONEOS || — || align=right | 3.1 km || 
|-id=842 bgcolor=#fefefe
| 74842 ||  || — || October 1, 1999 || Catalina || CSS || — || align=right | 3.2 km || 
|-id=843 bgcolor=#fefefe
| 74843 ||  || — || October 3, 1999 || Catalina || CSS || — || align=right | 2.2 km || 
|-id=844 bgcolor=#E9E9E9
| 74844 ||  || — || October 3, 1999 || Catalina || CSS || — || align=right | 3.8 km || 
|-id=845 bgcolor=#fefefe
| 74845 ||  || — || October 5, 1999 || Catalina || CSS || — || align=right | 1.9 km || 
|-id=846 bgcolor=#fefefe
| 74846 ||  || — || October 2, 1999 || Kitt Peak || Spacewatch || — || align=right | 2.6 km || 
|-id=847 bgcolor=#fefefe
| 74847 ||  || — || October 4, 1999 || Kitt Peak || Spacewatch || — || align=right | 1.7 km || 
|-id=848 bgcolor=#fefefe
| 74848 ||  || — || October 4, 1999 || Kitt Peak || Spacewatch || V || align=right | 1.5 km || 
|-id=849 bgcolor=#fefefe
| 74849 ||  || — || October 4, 1999 || Kitt Peak || Spacewatch || — || align=right | 1.5 km || 
|-id=850 bgcolor=#fefefe
| 74850 ||  || — || October 7, 1999 || Kitt Peak || Spacewatch || MAS || align=right | 1.8 km || 
|-id=851 bgcolor=#fefefe
| 74851 ||  || — || October 8, 1999 || Kitt Peak || Spacewatch || NYS || align=right | 1.3 km || 
|-id=852 bgcolor=#fefefe
| 74852 ||  || — || October 8, 1999 || Kitt Peak || Spacewatch || — || align=right | 2.5 km || 
|-id=853 bgcolor=#fefefe
| 74853 ||  || — || October 10, 1999 || Kitt Peak || Spacewatch || NYS || align=right | 1.0 km || 
|-id=854 bgcolor=#fefefe
| 74854 ||  || — || October 11, 1999 || Kitt Peak || Spacewatch || MAS || align=right | 1.6 km || 
|-id=855 bgcolor=#fefefe
| 74855 ||  || — || October 15, 1999 || Kitt Peak || Spacewatch || V || align=right | 1.3 km || 
|-id=856 bgcolor=#fefefe
| 74856 ||  || — || October 2, 1999 || Socorro || LINEAR || NYS || align=right | 1.4 km || 
|-id=857 bgcolor=#fefefe
| 74857 ||  || — || October 2, 1999 || Socorro || LINEAR || FLO || align=right | 2.0 km || 
|-id=858 bgcolor=#fefefe
| 74858 ||  || — || October 2, 1999 || Socorro || LINEAR || — || align=right | 1.8 km || 
|-id=859 bgcolor=#fefefe
| 74859 ||  || — || October 2, 1999 || Socorro || LINEAR || FLO || align=right | 1.6 km || 
|-id=860 bgcolor=#fefefe
| 74860 ||  || — || October 2, 1999 || Socorro || LINEAR || NYS || align=right | 1.7 km || 
|-id=861 bgcolor=#fefefe
| 74861 ||  || — || October 2, 1999 || Socorro || LINEAR || — || align=right | 2.2 km || 
|-id=862 bgcolor=#fefefe
| 74862 ||  || — || October 2, 1999 || Socorro || LINEAR || fast? || align=right | 1.7 km || 
|-id=863 bgcolor=#fefefe
| 74863 ||  || — || October 2, 1999 || Socorro || LINEAR || — || align=right | 2.2 km || 
|-id=864 bgcolor=#fefefe
| 74864 ||  || — || October 2, 1999 || Socorro || LINEAR || — || align=right | 1.8 km || 
|-id=865 bgcolor=#fefefe
| 74865 ||  || — || October 2, 1999 || Socorro || LINEAR || FLO || align=right | 1.5 km || 
|-id=866 bgcolor=#fefefe
| 74866 ||  || — || October 2, 1999 || Socorro || LINEAR || V || align=right | 1.7 km || 
|-id=867 bgcolor=#fefefe
| 74867 ||  || — || October 2, 1999 || Socorro || LINEAR || — || align=right | 1.8 km || 
|-id=868 bgcolor=#fefefe
| 74868 ||  || — || October 2, 1999 || Socorro || LINEAR || — || align=right | 2.1 km || 
|-id=869 bgcolor=#E9E9E9
| 74869 ||  || — || October 2, 1999 || Socorro || LINEAR || — || align=right | 3.1 km || 
|-id=870 bgcolor=#fefefe
| 74870 ||  || — || October 2, 1999 || Socorro || LINEAR || — || align=right | 2.3 km || 
|-id=871 bgcolor=#fefefe
| 74871 ||  || — || October 2, 1999 || Socorro || LINEAR || V || align=right | 1.6 km || 
|-id=872 bgcolor=#fefefe
| 74872 ||  || — || October 2, 1999 || Socorro || LINEAR || V || align=right | 1.6 km || 
|-id=873 bgcolor=#fefefe
| 74873 ||  || — || October 2, 1999 || Socorro || LINEAR || FLO || align=right | 1.6 km || 
|-id=874 bgcolor=#fefefe
| 74874 ||  || — || October 2, 1999 || Socorro || LINEAR || V || align=right | 2.2 km || 
|-id=875 bgcolor=#fefefe
| 74875 ||  || — || October 2, 1999 || Socorro || LINEAR || — || align=right | 1.8 km || 
|-id=876 bgcolor=#fefefe
| 74876 ||  || — || October 3, 1999 || Socorro || LINEAR || — || align=right | 2.3 km || 
|-id=877 bgcolor=#fefefe
| 74877 ||  || — || October 3, 1999 || Socorro || LINEAR || — || align=right | 1.9 km || 
|-id=878 bgcolor=#fefefe
| 74878 ||  || — || October 3, 1999 || Socorro || LINEAR || — || align=right | 2.2 km || 
|-id=879 bgcolor=#fefefe
| 74879 ||  || — || October 3, 1999 || Socorro || LINEAR || ERI || align=right | 2.5 km || 
|-id=880 bgcolor=#fefefe
| 74880 ||  || — || October 3, 1999 || Socorro || LINEAR || — || align=right | 2.7 km || 
|-id=881 bgcolor=#fefefe
| 74881 ||  || — || October 3, 1999 || Socorro || LINEAR || — || align=right | 2.4 km || 
|-id=882 bgcolor=#fefefe
| 74882 ||  || — || October 3, 1999 || Socorro || LINEAR || V || align=right | 1.9 km || 
|-id=883 bgcolor=#fefefe
| 74883 ||  || — || October 4, 1999 || Socorro || LINEAR || V || align=right | 1.6 km || 
|-id=884 bgcolor=#fefefe
| 74884 ||  || — || October 4, 1999 || Socorro || LINEAR || — || align=right | 1.8 km || 
|-id=885 bgcolor=#fefefe
| 74885 ||  || — || October 4, 1999 || Socorro || LINEAR || V || align=right | 1.6 km || 
|-id=886 bgcolor=#fefefe
| 74886 ||  || — || October 4, 1999 || Socorro || LINEAR || — || align=right | 2.1 km || 
|-id=887 bgcolor=#fefefe
| 74887 ||  || — || October 4, 1999 || Socorro || LINEAR || FLO || align=right | 1.4 km || 
|-id=888 bgcolor=#fefefe
| 74888 ||  || — || October 4, 1999 || Socorro || LINEAR || — || align=right | 3.9 km || 
|-id=889 bgcolor=#fefefe
| 74889 ||  || — || October 4, 1999 || Socorro || LINEAR || — || align=right | 1.8 km || 
|-id=890 bgcolor=#fefefe
| 74890 ||  || — || October 4, 1999 || Socorro || LINEAR || — || align=right | 2.1 km || 
|-id=891 bgcolor=#E9E9E9
| 74891 ||  || — || October 4, 1999 || Socorro || LINEAR || — || align=right | 1.7 km || 
|-id=892 bgcolor=#fefefe
| 74892 ||  || — || October 4, 1999 || Socorro || LINEAR || — || align=right | 1.6 km || 
|-id=893 bgcolor=#fefefe
| 74893 ||  || — || October 4, 1999 || Socorro || LINEAR || FLO || align=right | 1.4 km || 
|-id=894 bgcolor=#fefefe
| 74894 ||  || — || October 4, 1999 || Socorro || LINEAR || — || align=right | 1.9 km || 
|-id=895 bgcolor=#fefefe
| 74895 ||  || — || October 4, 1999 || Socorro || LINEAR || — || align=right | 1.5 km || 
|-id=896 bgcolor=#fefefe
| 74896 ||  || — || October 4, 1999 || Socorro || LINEAR || — || align=right | 1.6 km || 
|-id=897 bgcolor=#fefefe
| 74897 ||  || — || October 4, 1999 || Socorro || LINEAR || — || align=right | 3.6 km || 
|-id=898 bgcolor=#fefefe
| 74898 ||  || — || October 4, 1999 || Socorro || LINEAR || V || align=right | 2.2 km || 
|-id=899 bgcolor=#fefefe
| 74899 ||  || — || October 4, 1999 || Socorro || LINEAR || FLO || align=right | 1.9 km || 
|-id=900 bgcolor=#fefefe
| 74900 ||  || — || October 4, 1999 || Socorro || LINEAR || — || align=right | 2.3 km || 
|}

74901–75000 

|-bgcolor=#fefefe
| 74901 ||  || — || October 4, 1999 || Socorro || LINEAR || — || align=right | 1.7 km || 
|-id=902 bgcolor=#fefefe
| 74902 ||  || — || October 4, 1999 || Socorro || LINEAR || — || align=right | 2.1 km || 
|-id=903 bgcolor=#fefefe
| 74903 ||  || — || October 4, 1999 || Socorro || LINEAR || V || align=right | 1.5 km || 
|-id=904 bgcolor=#fefefe
| 74904 ||  || — || October 4, 1999 || Socorro || LINEAR || — || align=right | 2.0 km || 
|-id=905 bgcolor=#fefefe
| 74905 ||  || — || October 4, 1999 || Socorro || LINEAR || — || align=right | 2.1 km || 
|-id=906 bgcolor=#E9E9E9
| 74906 ||  || — || October 6, 1999 || Socorro || LINEAR || — || align=right | 2.2 km || 
|-id=907 bgcolor=#fefefe
| 74907 ||  || — || October 6, 1999 || Socorro || LINEAR || — || align=right | 2.0 km || 
|-id=908 bgcolor=#fefefe
| 74908 ||  || — || October 6, 1999 || Socorro || LINEAR || V || align=right | 1.3 km || 
|-id=909 bgcolor=#fefefe
| 74909 ||  || — || October 6, 1999 || Socorro || LINEAR || NYS || align=right | 1.4 km || 
|-id=910 bgcolor=#fefefe
| 74910 ||  || — || October 6, 1999 || Socorro || LINEAR || — || align=right | 1.4 km || 
|-id=911 bgcolor=#fefefe
| 74911 ||  || — || October 6, 1999 || Socorro || LINEAR || V || align=right | 1.7 km || 
|-id=912 bgcolor=#fefefe
| 74912 ||  || — || October 6, 1999 || Socorro || LINEAR || — || align=right | 2.1 km || 
|-id=913 bgcolor=#fefefe
| 74913 ||  || — || October 6, 1999 || Socorro || LINEAR || FLO || align=right | 1.6 km || 
|-id=914 bgcolor=#fefefe
| 74914 ||  || — || October 7, 1999 || Socorro || LINEAR || FLO || align=right | 2.4 km || 
|-id=915 bgcolor=#fefefe
| 74915 ||  || — || October 7, 1999 || Socorro || LINEAR || FLO || align=right | 1.5 km || 
|-id=916 bgcolor=#fefefe
| 74916 ||  || — || October 7, 1999 || Socorro || LINEAR || V || align=right | 1.6 km || 
|-id=917 bgcolor=#fefefe
| 74917 ||  || — || October 7, 1999 || Socorro || LINEAR || — || align=right | 1.8 km || 
|-id=918 bgcolor=#fefefe
| 74918 ||  || — || October 7, 1999 || Socorro || LINEAR || — || align=right | 1.7 km || 
|-id=919 bgcolor=#fefefe
| 74919 ||  || — || October 7, 1999 || Socorro || LINEAR || FLO || align=right | 1.7 km || 
|-id=920 bgcolor=#fefefe
| 74920 ||  || — || October 7, 1999 || Socorro || LINEAR || — || align=right | 1.6 km || 
|-id=921 bgcolor=#fefefe
| 74921 ||  || — || October 7, 1999 || Socorro || LINEAR || — || align=right | 1.7 km || 
|-id=922 bgcolor=#fefefe
| 74922 ||  || — || October 7, 1999 || Socorro || LINEAR || NYS || align=right | 1.3 km || 
|-id=923 bgcolor=#fefefe
| 74923 ||  || — || October 7, 1999 || Socorro || LINEAR || — || align=right | 1.5 km || 
|-id=924 bgcolor=#fefefe
| 74924 ||  || — || October 7, 1999 || Socorro || LINEAR || V || align=right | 1.9 km || 
|-id=925 bgcolor=#fefefe
| 74925 ||  || — || October 7, 1999 || Socorro || LINEAR || — || align=right | 2.2 km || 
|-id=926 bgcolor=#fefefe
| 74926 ||  || — || October 7, 1999 || Socorro || LINEAR || — || align=right | 2.1 km || 
|-id=927 bgcolor=#fefefe
| 74927 ||  || — || October 7, 1999 || Socorro || LINEAR || — || align=right | 1.7 km || 
|-id=928 bgcolor=#fefefe
| 74928 ||  || — || October 7, 1999 || Socorro || LINEAR || — || align=right | 1.7 km || 
|-id=929 bgcolor=#E9E9E9
| 74929 ||  || — || October 7, 1999 || Socorro || LINEAR || — || align=right | 2.6 km || 
|-id=930 bgcolor=#fefefe
| 74930 ||  || — || October 15, 1999 || Socorro || LINEAR || V || align=right | 1.4 km || 
|-id=931 bgcolor=#fefefe
| 74931 ||  || — || October 9, 1999 || Socorro || LINEAR || — || align=right | 1.6 km || 
|-id=932 bgcolor=#fefefe
| 74932 ||  || — || October 9, 1999 || Socorro || LINEAR || — || align=right | 1.6 km || 
|-id=933 bgcolor=#fefefe
| 74933 ||  || — || October 9, 1999 || Socorro || LINEAR || — || align=right | 2.0 km || 
|-id=934 bgcolor=#fefefe
| 74934 ||  || — || October 10, 1999 || Socorro || LINEAR || V || align=right | 2.3 km || 
|-id=935 bgcolor=#fefefe
| 74935 ||  || — || October 10, 1999 || Socorro || LINEAR || NYS || align=right | 4.3 km || 
|-id=936 bgcolor=#fefefe
| 74936 ||  || — || October 10, 1999 || Socorro || LINEAR || V || align=right | 1.3 km || 
|-id=937 bgcolor=#fefefe
| 74937 ||  || — || October 10, 1999 || Socorro || LINEAR || FLO || align=right | 1.5 km || 
|-id=938 bgcolor=#fefefe
| 74938 ||  || — || October 10, 1999 || Socorro || LINEAR || — || align=right | 1.9 km || 
|-id=939 bgcolor=#fefefe
| 74939 ||  || — || October 10, 1999 || Socorro || LINEAR || — || align=right | 2.1 km || 
|-id=940 bgcolor=#fefefe
| 74940 ||  || — || October 10, 1999 || Socorro || LINEAR || — || align=right | 2.1 km || 
|-id=941 bgcolor=#fefefe
| 74941 ||  || — || October 10, 1999 || Socorro || LINEAR || — || align=right | 1.7 km || 
|-id=942 bgcolor=#E9E9E9
| 74942 ||  || — || October 10, 1999 || Socorro || LINEAR || MRX || align=right | 2.3 km || 
|-id=943 bgcolor=#fefefe
| 74943 ||  || — || October 10, 1999 || Socorro || LINEAR || — || align=right | 3.2 km || 
|-id=944 bgcolor=#fefefe
| 74944 ||  || — || October 10, 1999 || Socorro || LINEAR || NYS || align=right | 1.6 km || 
|-id=945 bgcolor=#fefefe
| 74945 ||  || — || October 10, 1999 || Socorro || LINEAR || — || align=right | 1.6 km || 
|-id=946 bgcolor=#fefefe
| 74946 ||  || — || October 10, 1999 || Socorro || LINEAR || — || align=right | 2.5 km || 
|-id=947 bgcolor=#fefefe
| 74947 ||  || — || October 10, 1999 || Socorro || LINEAR || — || align=right | 2.0 km || 
|-id=948 bgcolor=#fefefe
| 74948 ||  || — || October 11, 1999 || Socorro || LINEAR || MAS || align=right | 2.0 km || 
|-id=949 bgcolor=#fefefe
| 74949 ||  || — || October 12, 1999 || Socorro || LINEAR || — || align=right | 1.5 km || 
|-id=950 bgcolor=#fefefe
| 74950 ||  || — || October 12, 1999 || Socorro || LINEAR || — || align=right | 4.3 km || 
|-id=951 bgcolor=#fefefe
| 74951 ||  || — || October 12, 1999 || Socorro || LINEAR || — || align=right | 1.7 km || 
|-id=952 bgcolor=#fefefe
| 74952 ||  || — || October 12, 1999 || Socorro || LINEAR || — || align=right | 1.9 km || 
|-id=953 bgcolor=#fefefe
| 74953 ||  || — || October 12, 1999 || Socorro || LINEAR || V || align=right | 1.2 km || 
|-id=954 bgcolor=#fefefe
| 74954 ||  || — || October 12, 1999 || Socorro || LINEAR || — || align=right | 2.2 km || 
|-id=955 bgcolor=#fefefe
| 74955 ||  || — || October 12, 1999 || Socorro || LINEAR || — || align=right | 3.2 km || 
|-id=956 bgcolor=#fefefe
| 74956 ||  || — || October 12, 1999 || Socorro || LINEAR || FLO || align=right | 2.6 km || 
|-id=957 bgcolor=#E9E9E9
| 74957 ||  || — || October 12, 1999 || Socorro || LINEAR || — || align=right | 2.0 km || 
|-id=958 bgcolor=#fefefe
| 74958 ||  || — || October 12, 1999 || Socorro || LINEAR || V || align=right | 1.1 km || 
|-id=959 bgcolor=#fefefe
| 74959 ||  || — || October 12, 1999 || Socorro || LINEAR || FLO || align=right | 2.2 km || 
|-id=960 bgcolor=#E9E9E9
| 74960 ||  || — || October 12, 1999 || Socorro || LINEAR || — || align=right | 7.5 km || 
|-id=961 bgcolor=#fefefe
| 74961 ||  || — || October 13, 1999 || Socorro || LINEAR || FLO || align=right | 1.9 km || 
|-id=962 bgcolor=#fefefe
| 74962 ||  || — || October 13, 1999 || Socorro || LINEAR || ERI || align=right | 4.3 km || 
|-id=963 bgcolor=#fefefe
| 74963 ||  || — || October 13, 1999 || Socorro || LINEAR || — || align=right | 1.9 km || 
|-id=964 bgcolor=#fefefe
| 74964 ||  || — || October 13, 1999 || Socorro || LINEAR || NYS || align=right | 1.8 km || 
|-id=965 bgcolor=#fefefe
| 74965 ||  || — || October 13, 1999 || Socorro || LINEAR || FLO || align=right | 1.8 km || 
|-id=966 bgcolor=#fefefe
| 74966 ||  || — || October 14, 1999 || Socorro || LINEAR || PHO || align=right | 5.3 km || 
|-id=967 bgcolor=#fefefe
| 74967 ||  || — || October 14, 1999 || Socorro || LINEAR || — || align=right | 1.6 km || 
|-id=968 bgcolor=#fefefe
| 74968 ||  || — || October 15, 1999 || Socorro || LINEAR || V || align=right | 1.6 km || 
|-id=969 bgcolor=#fefefe
| 74969 ||  || — || October 15, 1999 || Socorro || LINEAR || — || align=right | 1.7 km || 
|-id=970 bgcolor=#fefefe
| 74970 ||  || — || October 15, 1999 || Socorro || LINEAR || FLO || align=right | 2.2 km || 
|-id=971 bgcolor=#fefefe
| 74971 ||  || — || October 15, 1999 || Socorro || LINEAR || V || align=right | 1.6 km || 
|-id=972 bgcolor=#fefefe
| 74972 ||  || — || October 15, 1999 || Socorro || LINEAR || V || align=right | 1.8 km || 
|-id=973 bgcolor=#fefefe
| 74973 ||  || — || October 1, 1999 || Catalina || CSS || — || align=right | 2.0 km || 
|-id=974 bgcolor=#fefefe
| 74974 ||  || — || October 2, 1999 || Catalina || CSS || NYS || align=right | 1.2 km || 
|-id=975 bgcolor=#fefefe
| 74975 ||  || — || October 5, 1999 || Catalina || CSS || — || align=right | 1.7 km || 
|-id=976 bgcolor=#fefefe
| 74976 ||  || — || October 5, 1999 || Anderson Mesa || LONEOS || — || align=right | 2.0 km || 
|-id=977 bgcolor=#fefefe
| 74977 ||  || — || October 7, 1999 || Catalina || CSS || LCI || align=right | 2.6 km || 
|-id=978 bgcolor=#fefefe
| 74978 ||  || — || October 3, 1999 || Catalina || CSS || — || align=right | 4.0 km || 
|-id=979 bgcolor=#fefefe
| 74979 ||  || — || October 3, 1999 || Catalina || CSS || — || align=right | 2.0 km || 
|-id=980 bgcolor=#fefefe
| 74980 ||  || — || October 3, 1999 || Catalina || CSS || FLO || align=right | 1.8 km || 
|-id=981 bgcolor=#fefefe
| 74981 ||  || — || October 4, 1999 || Catalina || CSS || — || align=right | 1.5 km || 
|-id=982 bgcolor=#fefefe
| 74982 ||  || — || October 4, 1999 || Catalina || CSS || — || align=right | 2.1 km || 
|-id=983 bgcolor=#fefefe
| 74983 ||  || — || October 4, 1999 || Catalina || CSS || — || align=right | 2.0 km || 
|-id=984 bgcolor=#fefefe
| 74984 ||  || — || October 8, 1999 || Catalina || CSS || V || align=right | 1.9 km || 
|-id=985 bgcolor=#E9E9E9
| 74985 ||  || — || October 5, 1999 || Socorro || LINEAR || EUN || align=right | 4.3 km || 
|-id=986 bgcolor=#fefefe
| 74986 ||  || — || October 8, 1999 || Socorro || LINEAR || — || align=right | 1.5 km || 
|-id=987 bgcolor=#fefefe
| 74987 ||  || — || October 11, 1999 || Anderson Mesa || LONEOS || — || align=right | 3.7 km || 
|-id=988 bgcolor=#fefefe
| 74988 ||  || — || October 9, 1999 || Socorro || LINEAR || — || align=right | 1.3 km || 
|-id=989 bgcolor=#fefefe
| 74989 ||  || — || October 15, 1999 || Anderson Mesa || LONEOS || V || align=right | 1.5 km || 
|-id=990 bgcolor=#fefefe
| 74990 ||  || — || October 2, 1999 || Socorro || LINEAR || V || align=right | 1.9 km || 
|-id=991 bgcolor=#fefefe
| 74991 ||  || — || October 3, 1999 || Socorro || LINEAR || V || align=right | 1.4 km || 
|-id=992 bgcolor=#fefefe
| 74992 ||  || — || October 3, 1999 || Socorro || LINEAR || V || align=right | 1.6 km || 
|-id=993 bgcolor=#fefefe
| 74993 ||  || — || October 3, 1999 || Socorro || LINEAR || FLO || align=right | 1.5 km || 
|-id=994 bgcolor=#fefefe
| 74994 ||  || — || October 3, 1999 || Socorro || LINEAR || — || align=right | 2.0 km || 
|-id=995 bgcolor=#fefefe
| 74995 ||  || — || October 3, 1999 || Socorro || LINEAR || V || align=right | 1.8 km || 
|-id=996 bgcolor=#fefefe
| 74996 ||  || — || October 3, 1999 || Socorro || LINEAR || V || align=right | 2.0 km || 
|-id=997 bgcolor=#fefefe
| 74997 ||  || — || October 6, 1999 || Socorro || LINEAR || — || align=right | 1.3 km || 
|-id=998 bgcolor=#FA8072
| 74998 ||  || — || October 6, 1999 || Socorro || LINEAR || — || align=right | 2.6 km || 
|-id=999 bgcolor=#fefefe
| 74999 ||  || — || October 6, 1999 || Socorro || LINEAR || V || align=right | 2.1 km || 
|-id=000 bgcolor=#fefefe
| 75000 ||  || — || October 7, 1999 || Socorro || LINEAR || — || align=right | 2.1 km || 
|}

References

External links 
 Discovery Circumstances: Numbered Minor Planets (70001)–(75000) (IAU Minor Planet Center)

0074